

Deaths in November

 24: Abe Pollin
 16: Bobby Frankel
 10: Robert Enke
 9: Al Cervi

Current sporting seasons

American football 2009

NFL
NCAA Division I FBS

Auto racing 2009

V8 Supercar

GP2 Asia Series

Basketball 2009

NBA
NCAA Division I men
NCAA Division I women
Euroleague
Eurocup
EuroChallenge
ASEAN Basketball League
Australia
France
Germany
Greece
Iran
Israel
Italy
Philippines
Philippine Cup
Russia
Spain
Turkey

Cricket 2009–2010

Australia:
Sheffield Shield
Ford Ranger Cup

Bangladesh:
National League

India:
Ranji Trophy

New Zealand:
Plunket Shield
Pakistan:
Quaid-i-Azam Trophy
South Africa:
SuperSport Series
Sri Lanka:
Premier Trophy

Zimbabwe:
Logan Cup

Football (soccer) 2009

National teams competitions
2011 FIFA Women's World Cup qualification (UEFA)
2011 AFC Asian Cup qualification
International clubs competitions
UEFA (Europe) Champions League
Europa League
UEFA Women's Champions League

Copa Sudamericana

CAF Confederation Cup
CONCACAF (North & Central America) Champions League
OFC (Oceania) Champions League
Domestic (national) competitions
Argentina
Australia
Brazil
England
France
Germany
Iran
Italy
Japan

Scotland
Spain

Ice hockey 2009

National Hockey League

Rugby union 2009

Heineken Cup
Amlin Challenge Cup
English Premiership
Celtic League
LV= Cup
Top 14

Winter sports

Alpine Skiing World Cup

Bobsleigh World Cup
Cross-Country Skiing World Cup
Grand Prix of Figure Skating

Luge World Cup
Nordic Combined World Cup

Skeleton World Cup
Ski Jumping World Cup
Snowboarding World Cup
Speed Skating World Cup

Days of the month

November 30, 2009 (Monday)

American football
NFL Monday Night Football Week 12 (unbeaten team in bold):
New Orleans Saints 38, New England Patriots 17

Tennis
 Serena Williams is fined US$82,500 for her tirade at a lineswoman during the 2009 US Open, and faces a suspension from that tournament if she commits another "major offense" at a Grand Slam event in 2010 or 2011. (AP via ESPN)

November 29, 2009 (Sunday)

Alpine skiing
Men's World Cup in Lake Louise, Canada:
Super-G:  Manuel Osborne-Paradis   Benjamin Raich   Michael Walchhofer 
Overall standings after 4 of 34 races: (1) Didier Cuche  226 points (2) Raich 165 (3) Carlo Janka  160
Women's World Cup in Aspen, USA:
Slalom:  Šárka Záhrobská   Marlies Schild   Kathrin Zettel 
Overall standings after 4 of 33 races: (1) Zettel 220 points (2) Maria Riesch  176 (3) Tanja Poutiainen  165

American football
NFL Week 12:
Indianapolis Colts 35, Houston Texans 27
Colts rally from a 13-point halftime deficit to score their 20th straight win, one short of the NFL record, and clinch the AFC South title.
Buffalo Bills 31, Miami Dolphins 14
Seattle Seahawks 27, St. Louis Rams 17
New York Jets 17, Carolina Panthers 6
Cincinnati Bengals 16, Cleveland Browns 7
Philadelphia Eagles 27, Washington Redskins 24
Atlanta Falcons 20, Tampa Bay Buccaneers 17
San Diego Chargers 43, Kansas City Chiefs 14
San Francisco 49ers 20, Jacksonville Jaguars 3
Tennessee Titans 20, Arizona Cardinals 17
Minnesota Vikings 36, Chicago Bears 10
Sunday Night Football: Baltimore Ravens 20, Pittsburgh Steelers 17 (overtime)
After missing a 56-yard field goal at the end of regulation, newly acquired kicker Billy Cundiff connects from 29 yards to win a crucial AFC North matchup.

Basketball
NBA:
The New Jersey Nets fire head coach Lawrence Frank after an 0–16 start. Frank becomes the second NBA coach to be axed this season, after Byron Scott. (ESPN). Frank's assistant Tom Barrise takes his place, and guides the team in their 17th straight loss, 106–87 to the Los Angeles Lakers, which ties the 1988–89 Miami Heat and 1999 Los Angeles Clippers for the worst start to a season in NBA history.

Canadian football
97th Grey Cup game in Calgary:
Montreal Alouettes 28, Saskatchewan Roughriders 27: The Alouettes win on the final play of the game.

Cricket
England in South Africa:
4th ODI in Port Elizabeth:
 119 (36.5 overs);  121/3 (31.2 overs). England win by 7 wickets, lead the 5-match series 2–1.

Cross-country skiing
World Cup in Kuusamo, Finland:
Women's 10 km Classic:  Aino-Kaisa Saarinen   Irina Khazova   Vibeke Skofterud 
Men's 15 km Classic:  Petter Northug   Maxim Vylegzhanin   Alexander Legkov

Field hockey
Men's Champions Trophy in Melbourne, Australia:
 5–3 
 2–7 
 3–3 
Standings: Australia 6 points, Germany, Korea, Netherlands 3, England, Spain 1.

Football (soccer)
CAF Confederation Cup Finals, first leg:
ES Sétif  2–0  Stade Malien
OFC Champions League Group stage, Matchday 3:
Group B: Lautoka F.C.  1–2  Tafea FC
Standings: Tafea 7 points (3 matches), Lautoka 6 (3), PRK Hekari United 1 (2), Marist FC 0 (2).
 La Liga, matchday 12:
El Clásico: Barcelona 1–0 Real Madrid
Standings: Barcelona 30 points, Real Madrid 28, Sevilla 26.
 Ecuadorian Championship playoff, first leg:
Deportivo Cuenca 1–1 Deportivo Quito
 Russian Premier League, final matchday: (teams in bold qualify for the Champions League, teams in italics qualify for the Europa League)
Standings: Rubin Kazan 63 points, Spartak Moscow 55, Zenit St. Petersburg, Lokomotiv Moscow 54, CSKA Moscow 52.

Golf
Off-season men's events:
Omega Mission Hills World Cup in Shenzhen, China:
Winners: Francesco Molinari and Edoardo Molinari  259 (−29)
The Molinaris are the first brothers to win the World Cup.

Horse racing
Japan Cup in Tokyo:
 Winner: Vodka (jockey: Christophe Lemaire, trainer: Katsuhiko Sumii)

Luge
World Cup in Igls, Austria:
Men:  Armin Zöggeler  1:37.988  Wilfried Huber  1:38.085  Viktor Kneib  1:38.091
Standings after 2 of 8 races: (1) Zöggeler 200 points (2) David Möller  131 (3) Felix Loch  120
Teams:  Canada (Samuel Edney, Alex Gough, Chris Moffat/Mike Moffat) 2:10.864  Austria (Reinhard Egger, Nina Reithmayer, Andreas Linger/Wolfgang Linger) 2:11.868  Latvia (Guntis Rēķis, Maija Tīruma, Andris Sics/Juris Sics) 2:12.094

Nordic combined
World Cup in Kuusamo, Finland:
HS142 / 10 km:  Hannu Manninen   Tino Edelmann   Eric Frenzel 
Standing after 2 of 19 events: (1) Manninen 180 points (2) Jason Lamy Chappuis  145 (3) Frenzel 120

Snooker
Premier League Snooker – Final in Hopton-on-Sea, Norfolk
Shaun Murphy  def. Ronnie O'Sullivan  7–3

Tennis
ATP World Tour:
ATP World Tour Finals in London, United Kingdom:
Final: (6) Nikolay Davydenko  def. (5) Juan Martín del Potro  6–3, 6–4
Davydenko wins his fifth title of the year and 19th of his career.
Doubles Final: Bob Bryan/Mike Bryan  def. Max Mirnyi /Andy Ram  7–6(5), 6–3
The Bryan twins win the year-end tournament for the third time, and claim the year-end #1 ranking for the fifth time.

Weightlifting
World Championships in Goyang, South Korea:
Men 105kg:
Total:  Marcin Dołęga  421 kg  Dmitry Lapikov  416 kg  Albert Kuzilov  408 kg
Snatch:  Dołęga 195 kg  Lapikov 194 kg  Kuzilov 187 kg
Clean & Jerk:  Dołęga 226 kg  Lapikov 222 kg  Kuzilov 221 kg
Men +105kg:
Total:  An Yong-Kwon  445 kg  Artem Udachyn  445 kg  Ihor Shymechko  427 kg
Snatch:  Shymechko 202 kg  Udachyn 200 kg  An 198 kg
Clean & Jerk:  An 247 kg  Udachyn 245 kg  Andrey Kozlov  231 kg

November 28, 2009 (Saturday)

American football
NCAA Division I FBS:
BCS Top 10 (unbeaten teams in bold):
Florida–Florida State rivalry: (1) Florida 37, Florida State 10
The Gators will play #2 Alabama in the SEC Championship Game on December 5 with both teams unbeaten.
(4) TCU 51, New Mexico 10
 The Horned Frogs complete a 12–0 regular season and all but clinch a BCS bowl bid.
Clean, Old-Fashioned Hate: Georgia 30, (7) Georgia Tech 24
Played earlier this week: (2) Alabama, (3) Texas, (5) Cincinnati, (6) Boise State, (9) Pittsburgh
Idle: (8) Oregon, (10) Ohio State
Other games:
Bedlam Series: Oklahoma 27, (12) Oklahoma State 0
Carolina–Clemson rivalry: South Carolina 34, (18) Clemson 17
The Holy War: (19) Brigham Young 26, (21) Utah 23 (OT)
Carolina–NC State rivalry: North Carolina State 28, (24) North Carolina 27
Egg Bowl: Mississippi State 41, (25) Mississippi 27
NCAA Division I FCS:
Playoffs, first round (seeds in parentheses):
(1) Montana 61, South Dakota State 48
 The Grizzlies, down 48–21 late in the third quarter, score 40 unanswered points.
Stephen F. Austin 44, Eastern Washington 33
(4) Richmond 16, Elon 13
Appalachian State 20, South Carolina State 13
(2) Villanova 38, Holy Cross 28
New Hampshire 49, McNeese State 13
(3) Southern Illinois 48, Eastern Illinois 7
 William & Mary 38, Weber State 0
Bayou Classic in New Orleans: Grambling State 31, Southern 13

Alpine skiing
Men's World Cup in Lake Louise, Canada:
Downhill:  Didier Cuche  1:50.31  Werner Heel  1:50.75  Carlo Janka  1:50.93
Cuche wins his second race of the season.
Overall standings after 3 of 34 races: (1) Cuche 200 points (2) Janka 120 (3) Ivica Kostelic  115
Women's World Cup in Aspen, USA:
Giant slalom:  Kathrin Hölzl  2:09.63  Kathrin Zettel  2:09.87  Federica Brignone  2:10.76
Overall standings after 3 of 33 races: (1) Tanja Poutiainen  165 points (2) Zettel 160 (3) Hölzl 136
Giant slalom standings after 2 of 7 races: (1) Zettel 160 points (2) Hölzl 136 (3) Poutiainen 105

Canadian football
CIS football championships:
Vanier Cup national championship game in Quebec City:
(4) Queen's Golden Gaels 33, (2) Calgary Dinos 31
The Gaels come back from a 25–7 halftime deficit to win their fourth Vanier Cup, and deny the Dinos quarterback Erik Glavic to become the fifth player to win the Hec Crighton Trophy Trophy and the Vanier Cup in the same year.

Cricket
Pakistan in New Zealand:
1st Test in Dunedin, day 5:
 429 and 153;  332 and 218. New Zealand win by 32 runs, lead the 3-match series 1–0.
West Indies in Australia:
1st Test in Woolloongabba, Brisbane, day 3:
 480/8d;  228 and 187 (f/o, Adrian Barath 104). Australia win by an innings and 65 runs, lead the 3-match series 1–0.

Cross-country skiing
World Cup in Kuusamo, Finland:
Women's Sprint Classic:  Justyna Kowalczyk   Petra Majdic   Alena Prochazkova 
Men's Sprint Classic:  Ola Vigen Hattestad   Øystein Pettersen   Nikita Kriukov

Field hockey
Men's Champions Trophy in Melbourne, Australia:
 3–2 
 4–0 
 2–3

Football (soccer)
OFC Champions League Group stage, Matchday 3:
Group A:
Waitakere United  1–1  Auckland City FC
AS Manu-Ura  1–1  AS Magenta
Standings: Auckland City 7 points, Waitakere United 5, Magenta 2, Manu-Ura 1.

Luge
World Cup in Igls, Austria:
Women:  Natalie Geisenberger  1:19.229  Tatjana Hüfner  1:19.282  Anke Wischnewski  1:19.289
Standings after 2 of 8 races: (1) Hüfner & Geisenberger 185 points (3) Wischnewski 140
Doubles:  Patric Leitner/Alexander Resch  1:18.631  André Florschütz/Torsten Wustlich  1:18.732  Andreas Linger/Wolfgang Linger  1:18.737
Standings after 2 of 8 races: (1) Leitner/Resch 200 points (2) Florschütz/Wustlich 170 (3) Christian Oberstolz/Patrick Gruber  & Linger/Linger 130

Nordic combined
World Cup in Kuusamo, Finland:
HS142 / 10 km:  Jason Lamy Chappuis  27:05.0  Hannu Manninen  27:13.1  Eric Frenzel  27:15.6

Rugby union
End of year tests:
Week 5:
 24–6  in Ascoli Piceno
 15–10  in Dublin
 6–9  in Edinburgh
 19–24  in Lisbon
 12–33  in Cardiff
 18–29  in Bucharest
 12–39  in Marseille
 22–6  in Burnaby
2011 Rugby World Cup qualifying:
Africa Round 3, second leg: (first leg score in parentheses)
 22–10 (18–13)  in Windhoek. Namibia win 40–23 on aggregate.
Namibia qualify for their fourth consecutive World Cup, while Tunisia will face the third-placed team from Europe in the Semi-Finals of the Play-off series.

Ski jumping
World Cup in Kuusamo, Finland:
HS 142:  Bjørn Einar Romøren  299.8 points (139.5m/139.0m)  Pascal Bodmer  290.7 (133.0/141.0)  Wolfgang Loitzl  290.4 (136.5/136.5)

Snooker
Premier League Snooker – Semi-finals in Hopton-on-Sea, Norfolk
Shaun Murphy  def. John Higgins  5–3
Ronnie O'Sullivan  def. Judd Trump  5–1

Swimming
World record set (short course):
Women's 1500m freestyle: Lotte Friis  15:28.65, Birkerød, Denmark

Tennis
ATP World Tour:
ATP World Tour Finals in London, United Kingdom:
Semifinals:
(6) Nikolay Davydenko  def. (1) Roger Federer  6–2, 4–6, 7–5
(5) Juan Martín del Potro  def. (8) Robin Söderling  6–7(1), 6–3, 7–6(3)

Weightlifting
World Championships in Goyang, South Korea:
Women 75kg:
Snatch:  Svetlana Podobedova  132 kg  Cao Lei  121 kg  Hripsime Khurshudyan  120 kg
Clean & Jerk:  Podobedova 160 kg  Cao 148 kg  Khurshudyan 147 kg
Total:  Podobedova 292 kg  Cao 269 kg  Khurshudyan 267 kg
Women +75kg:
Snatch:  Tatiana Kashirina  138 kg  Jang Mi-Ran  136 kg  Meng Suping  131 kg
Clean & Jerk:  Jang 187 kg  Kashirina 165 kg  Meng 165 kg
Total:  Jang 323 kg  Kashirina 303 kg  Meng 296 kg

November 27, 2009 (Friday)

American football
NCAA Division I FBS:
BCS Top 10 (unbeaten teams in bold):
Iron Bowl: (2) Alabama 26, Auburn 21
The Crimson Tide complete a 12–0 regular season.
(5) Cincinnati 49, Illinois 36
(6) Boise State 44, Nevada 33
The Broncos clinch the WAC championship title.
The Backyard Brawl: West Virginia 19, (9) Pittsburgh 16

Basketball
NCAA:
NIT Season Tip-Off Final in New York City:
Duke 68, UConn 59

Cricket
Sri Lanka in India:
2nd Test in Kanpur, day 4:
 642;  229 & 269. India win by an innings and 144 runs & lead the 3-match series 1–0.
Pakistan in New Zealand:
1st Test in Dunedin, day 4:
 429 & 147/8;  332. New Zealand lead by 244 runs with 2 wickets remaining.
West Indies in Australia:
1st Test in Woolloongabba, Brisbane, day 2:
 480/8d;  134/5 (39 ov). West Indies trail by 346 runs with 5 wickets remaining in the 1st innings.
England in South Africa:
3rd ODI in Cape Town:
 354/6 (50 overs, AB de Villiers 121);  242 (41.3 overs). South Africa win by 112 runs & the 5-match series level 1–1.

Rugby union
End of year tests:
Week 5:
 31–0  in Dublin

Ski jumping
World Cup in Kuusamo, Finland:
HS 142 Team:  Austria (Wolfgang Loitzl, Andreas Kofler, Gregor Schlierenzauer, Thomas Morgenstern) 1113.6  Germany (Michael Uhrmann, Michael Neumayer, Pascal Bodmer, Martin Schmitt) 1099.2  Finland (Matti Hautamäki, Kalle Keituri, Harri Olli, Janne Ahonen) 1058.0

Tennis
ATP World Tour:
ATP World Tour Finals in London, United Kingdom: (players in bold advance to the semifinals)
Group B:
Novak Djokovic  [3] def. Rafael Nadal  [2] 7–6(5), 6–3
Nikolay Davydenko  [6] def. Robin Söderling  [8] 7–6(4), 4–6, 6–3
Standings: Söderling, Davydenko, Djokovic 2–1, Nadal 0–3.

Weightlifting
World Championships in Goyang, South Korea:
Women 69kg:
Snatch:  Nazik Avdalyan  119 kg  Oxana Slivenko  118 kg  Zhang Shaoling  112 kg
Clean & Jerk:  Avdalyan 147 kg  Slivenko 146 kg  Zhang 136 kg
Total:  Avdalyan 266 kg  Slivenko 264 kg  Zhang 248 kg
Men 94kg:
Snatch:  Vladimir Sedov  185 kg  Artem Ivanov  180 kg  Kim Min-Jae  178 kg
Clean & Jerk:  Kim Seon-Jong  218 kg  Sedov 217 kg  Valeriu Calancea  211 kg
Total:  Sedov 402 kg  Nizami Pashayev  387 kg  Kim Min-Jae 384 kg

November 26, 2009 (Thursday)

American football
NFL Week 12: Thanksgiving Day games
Green Bay Packers 34, Detroit Lions 12
Dallas Cowboys 24, Oakland Raiders 7
Denver Broncos 26, New York Giants 6
NCAA BCS Top 10 (unbeaten team in bold):
Lone Star Showdown: (3) Texas 49, Texas A&M 39
The Longhorns complete a 12–0 regular season.

Basketball
Euroleague:
Regular Season Game 5: (unbeaten teams in bold)
Group A:
Montepaschi Siena  65–84  Regal FC Barcelona
Standings: Barcelona 5–0, Siena 4–1, Fenerbahçe Ülker 3–2, Cibona, Žalgiris, Villeurbanne 1–4.
Group B:
Efes Pilsen Istanbul  77–64  Entente Orléans Loiret
Unicaja Málaga  91–84  Lietuvos Rytas Vilnius
Partizan Belgrade  86–80  Olympiacos Piraeus
Standings: Unicaja 5–0, Olympiacos, Lietuvos Rytas 3–2, Efes Pilsen, Partizan 2–3, Orléans 0–5.
Group C:
Maccabi Tel Aviv  75–67  Maroussi Athens
Caja Laboral Baskonia  67–71  CSKA Moscow
Standings: Maccabi 4–1, Roma, CSKA Moscow, Caja Laboral 3–2, Maroussi, Olimpija 1–4.
Group D:
Real Madrid  82–69  Armani Jeans Milano
Standings: Panathinaikos, Real Madrid, Khimki 4–1, Milano, Asseco Prokom, EWE Baskets 1–4.

Cricket
Sri Lanka in India:
2nd Test in Kanpur, day 3:
 642;  229 & 57/4 (f/o, 23.0 ov). Sri Lanka trail by 356 runs with 6 wickets remaining.
Pakistan in New Zealand:
1st Test in Dunedin, day 3:
 429;  307/8 (90.0 ov, Umar Akmal 129). Pakistan trail by 122 runs with 2 wickets remaining in the 1st innings.
West Indies in Australia:
1st Test in Woolloongabba, Brisbane, day 1:
 322/5 (90.0 ov)

Football (soccer)
2011 FIFA Women's World Cup qualification (UEFA):
Group 3:  5–0 
Standings: Denmark 7 points (3 matches), Scotland 6 (2), Greece 6 (4), Bulgaria 4 (3).
Group 5:  0–3 
Standings: Spain 12 points (4 matches), England 6 (2), Austria 3 (3).
Group 8:  1–2 
Standings: Sweden 9 points (3 matches), Belgium 7 (5), Azerbaijan 4 (3), Wales 3 (4), Czech Republic 3 (3).

Tennis
ATP World Tour:
ATP World Tour Finals in London, United Kingdom: (players in bold advance to the semifinals)
Group A:
Andy Murray  [4] def. Fernando Verdasco  [7] 6–4, 6–7(4), 7–6(3)
Juan Martín del Potro  [5] def. Roger Federer  [1] 6–4, 6–7(5), 6–3
Standings: Federer, del Potro, Murray 2–1, Verdasco 0–3.
del Potro advances to the semis thanks to one game advantage over Murray.

Weightlifting
World Championships in Goyang, South Korea:
Men 85kg:
Snatch:  Lu Yong  175 kg  Tigran Vardan Martirosyan  172 kg  Siarhei Lahun  171 kg
Clean & Jerk:  Lahun 209 kg  Lu 208 kg  Gevorik Poghosyan  208 kg
Total:  Lu 383 kg  Lahun 380 kg  Vladimir Kuznetsov  376 kg

November 25, 2009 (Wednesday)

Basketball
Euroleague:
Regular Season Game 5:
Group A:
Žalgiris Kaunas  78–84  Fenerbahçe Ülker Istanbul
ASVEL Villeurbanne  71–68  Cibona Zagreb
Standings: Siena, Barcelona 4–0, Fenerbahçe Ülker 3–2, Cibona, Žalgiris, Villeurbanne 1–4.
Group C:
Union Olimpija Ljubljana  87–70  Lottomatica Roma
Standings: Caja Laboral, Maccabi 3–1, Roma 3–2, CSKA Moscow 2–2, Maroussi 1–3, Olimpija 1–4.
Group D:
Khimki Moscow Region  89–67  Asseco Prokom Gdynia
Panathinaikos Athens  96–63  EWE Baskets Oldenburg
Standings: Panathinaikos, Khimki 4–1, Real Madrid 3–1, Milano 1–3, EWE Baskets, Asseco Prokom 1–4.

Cricket
Sri Lanka in India:
2nd Test in Kanpur, day 2:
 642 (Rahul Dravid 144);  66/1 (24.0 ov). Sri Lanka trail by 576 runs with 9 wickets remaining in the 1st innings.
Pakistan in New Zealand:
1st Test in Dunedin, day 2:
 404/8 (126.0 ov)
Only 36 overs were played due to rain and bad light. Daniel Vettori just misses a century when he is dismissed at 99, but still manages to surpass Shane Warne and become the highest no. 8 Test run-getter.

Football (soccer)
2011 FIFA Women's World Cup qualification (UEFA):
Group 7:  7–0 
Standings: Italy, Finland 12 points (4 matches), Portugal 3 (3), Slovenia 3 (4).
UEFA Champions League group stage, Matchday 5: (teams in bold advance to the round of 16, teams in italics advance to the round of 32 in Europa League, teams in strike are eliminated)
Group A:
Bayern Munich  1–0  Maccabi Haifa
Bordeaux  2–0  Juventus
Standings: Bordeaux 13 points, Juventus 8, Bayern Munich 7, Maccabi Haifa 0.
Group B:
CSKA Moscow  2–1  Wolfsburg
Manchester United  0–1  Beşiktaş
Standings: Manchester United 10 points, Wolfsburg, CSKA Moscow 7, Beşiktaş 4.
Group C:
Milan  1–1  Marseille
Real Madrid  1–0  Zürich
Standings: Real Madrid 10 points, Milan 8, Marseille 7, Zürich 3.
Group D:
APOEL  1–1  Atlético Madrid
Porto  0–1  Chelsea
Standings: Chelsea 13 points, Porto 9, Atlético Madrid 3, APOEL 2.
Copa Sudamericana Finals, first leg:
LDU Quito  5–1  Fluminense

Tennis
ATP World Tour:
ATP World Tour Finals in London, United Kingdom: (players in bold advance to the semifinals)
Group B:
Robin Söderling  [8] def. Novak Djokovic  [3] 7–6(5), 6–1
Nikolay Davydenko  [6] def. Rafael Nadal  [2] 6–1, 7–6(4)
Standings: Söderling 2–0, Davydenko, Djokovic 1–1, Nadal 0–2.

Weightlifting
World Championships in Goyang, South Korea:
Women 63kg:
Snatch:  Viktoriya Savenko  112 kg  Hanna Batsiushka  112 kg  Svetlana Tsarukaeva  111 kg
Clean & Jerk:  Maya Maneza  141 kg  Sibel Şimşek  135 kg  Guo Xiyan  135 kg
Total:  Maneza 246 kg  Tsarukaeva 246 kg  Şimşek 243 kg

November 24, 2009 (Tuesday)

Baseball
 Major League Baseball awards:
National League MVP — Albert Pujols, St. Louis Cardinals, 1B
Pujols wins the award for the second straight year and third time overall.

Cricket
Sri Lanka in India:
2nd Test in Kanpur, day 1:
 417/2 (90.0 Ov, Gautam Gambhir 167, Virender Sehwag 131)
Pakistan in New Zealand:
1st Test in Dunedin, day 1:
 276/6 (90.0 ov)

Football (soccer)
UEFA Champions League group stage, Matchday 5: (teams in bold advance to the round of 16, teams in italics advance to the round of 32 in Europa League, teams in strike are eliminated)
Group E:
Debrecen  0–1  Liverpool
Fiorentina  1–0  Lyon
Standings: Fiorentina 12 points, Lyon 10, Liverpool 7, Debrecen 0.
Group F:
Barcelona  2–0  Internazionale
Rubin Kazan  0–0  Dynamo Kyiv
Standings: Barcelona 8 points, Inter, Rubin Kazan 6, Dynamo Kyiv 5.
Group G:
Rangers  0–2  Stuttgart
Unirea Urziceni  1–0  Sevilla
Standings: Sevilla 10 points, Unirea Urziceni 8, Stuttgart 6, Rangers 2.
Group H:
AZ  0–0  Olympiacos
Arsenal  2–0  Standard Liège
Standings: Arsenal 13 points, Olympiacos 7, Standard Liège 4, AZ 3.

Rugby union
End of year tests:
Week 5:
Cardiff Blues  3–31  in Cardiff

Tennis
ATP World Tour:
ATP World Tour Finals in London, United Kingdom:
Group A:
Juan Martín del Potro  [5] def. Fernando Verdasco  [7] 6–4, 3–6, 7–6(1)
Roger Federer  [1] def. Andy Murray  [4] 3–6, 6–3, 6–1
Federer's win secures him the year-end #1 ranking for the fifth time.
Standings: Federer 2–0, Murray, del Potro 1–1, Verdasco 0–2.

Weightlifting
World Championships in Goyang, South Korea:
Men 77kg:
Snatch:  Lü Xiaojun  174 kg  Tigran Gevorg Martirosyan  170 kg  Su Dajin  165 kg
Clean & Jerk:  Sa Jae-Hyouk  205 kg  Lu 204 kg  Su 200 kg
Total:  Lu 378 kg  Martirosyan 370 kg  Su 365 kg

November 23, 2009 (Monday)

American football
NFL Monday Night Football, Week 11
Tennessee Titans 20, Houston Texans 17

Baseball
 Major League Baseball awards:
American League MVP — Joe Mauer, catcher, Minnesota Twins

Golf
LPGA Tour:
LPGA Tour Championship in Richmond, Texas:
Winner: Anna Nordqvist  203 (−13)
The tournament was shortened to 54 holes.

Tennis
ATP World Tour:
ATP World Tour Finals in London, United Kingdom:
Group B:
Robin Söderling  [8] def. Rafael Nadal  [2] 6–4, 6–4
Novak Djokovic  [3] def. Nikolay Davydenko  [6] 3–6, 6–4, 7–5

Volleyball
Men's World Grand Champions Cup in Japan:
Round 5 in Nagoya:
 3–1 
 3–0 
 3–0 
Final standings:  Brazil 10 points,  Cuba 9,  Japan 8, Poland 7, Iran 6, Egypt 5.
Brazil win the title for the third time.

Weightlifting
World Championships in Goyang, South Korea:
Women 58kg:
Snatch:  Li Xueying  107 kg  Nastassia Novikava  100 kg  Yuliya Kalina  96 kg
Clean & Jerk:  Li 132 kg  Novikava 125 kg  Kalina 119 kg
Total:  Li 239 kg  Novikava 225 kg  Kalina 215 kg

November 22, 2009 (Sunday)

American football
NFL Week 11 (unbeaten teams in bold):
Dallas Cowboys 7, Washington Redskins 6
Green Bay Packers 30, San Francisco 49ers 24
Kansas City Chiefs 27, Pittsburgh Steelers 24 (OT)
Minnesota Vikings 35, Seattle Seahawks 9
New York Giants 34, Atlanta Falcons 31 (OT)
New Orleans Saints 38, Tampa Bay Buccaneers 7
Jacksonville Jaguars 18, Buffalo Bills 15
Indianapolis Colts 17, Baltimore Ravens 15
Detroit Lions 38, Cleveland Browns 37
Matthew Stafford's 1-yard touchdown pass to Brandon Pettigrew on an untimed down with no time remaining ties the game, and Jason Hanson's extra point wins it.
Arizona Cardinals 21, St. Louis Rams 13
San Diego Chargers 32, Denver Broncos 3
Oakland Raiders 20, Cincinnati Bengals 17
New England Patriots 31, New York Jets 14
Sunday Night Football: Philadelphia Eagles 24, Chicago Bears 20

Auto racing
Chase for the Sprint Cup:
Ford 400 in Homestead, Florida:
(1) Denny Hamlin  (Toyota, Joe Gibbs Racing) (2) Jeff Burton  (Chevrolet, Richard Childress Racing) (3) Kevin Harvick  (Chevrolet, Richard Childress Racing)
Final drivers' standings: (1) Jimmie Johnson  (Chevrolet, Hendrick Motorsports) 6652 points (2) Mark Martin  (Chevrolet, Hendrick Motorsports) 6511 (3) Jeff Gordon  (Chevrolet, Hendrick Motorsports) 6473
Johnson becomes the first driver ever to win four consecutive Cup Series titles.
V8 Supercars:
BigPond 300 in Perth, Western Australia:
Race 24: (1) Craig Lowndes  (Ford Falcon) (2) Steven Johnson  (Ford Falcon) (3) Garth Tander  (Holden Commodore)
Drivers' standings (after 24 of 26 races): (1) Whincup 3175 points (2) Will Davison  (Holden Commodore) 2894 (3) Tander 2766

Badminton
BWF Super Series:
China Open Super Series in Shanghai:
Mixed doubles: Lee Yong-dae/Lee Hyo-jung  [1] def. Zheng Bo/Ma Jin  [2] 21–18 15–21 21–15
Men's singles: Lin Dan  [2] def. Jan Ø. Jørgensen  21–12 21–12
Women's doubles: Tian Qing/Zhang Yawen  [6] def. Du Jing/Yu Yang  [2] 21–14 21–14
Women's singles: Jiang Yanjiao  [6] def. Wang Xin  21–19 22–20
Men's doubles: Jung Jae-sung/Lee Yong-dae  [2] def. Koo Kien Keat/Tan Boon Heong  [1] 21–13 19–21 21–18

Bobsleigh
World Cup in Lake Placid, United States:
Four-man:  Steven Holcomb/Justin Olsen/Steve Mesler/Curtis Tomasevicz  1:49.60  John Napier/Jamie Moriarty/Steven Langton/Christopher Fogt  1:50.04  Wolfgang Stampfer/Johannes Wipplinger/Juergen Mayer/Martin Lachkovics   1:50.14
Standings (after 2 of 8 races): (1) Jānis Miņins  394 points (2) Lyndon Rush  393 (3) Holcomb 393
Team:  Frank Rommel, Sandra Kiriasis/Berit Wiacker, Marion Trott, Thomas Florschütz/Marc Kühne  3:46.92  Eric Bernotas, Erin Pac/Jamie Greubel, Noelle Pikus-Pace, John Napier/T.J. Burns  3:47.97  Jon Montgomery, Kaillie Humphries/Amanda Morely, Mellisa Hollingsworth, Lyndon Rush/Neville Wright  3:48.18

Canadian football
Grey Cup Playoffs:
Division Finals:
Montreal Alouettes 56, BC Lions 18
Saskatchewan Roughriders 27, Calgary Stampeders 17

Cricket
England in South Africa:
2nd ODI in Centurion:
 250/9 (50 overs);  252/3 (46 overs, Paul Collingwood 105*). England win by 7 wickets and lead the 5-match series 1–0.

Cross-country skiing
World Cup in Beitostolen, Norway:
Women's 4 x 5 km Relay:  Anna Olsson/Sara Lindborg/Anna Haag/Charlotte Kalla  58:37.1  Vibeke Skofterud/Therese Johaug/Kristin Størmer Steira/Marit Bjørgen  58:53.8  Pirjo Muranen/Virpi Kuitunen/Riitta-Liisa Roponen/Aino-Kaisa Saarinen  58:59.1
Men's 4 x 10 km Relay:  Eldar Rønning/Martin Johnsrud Sundby/Ronny Hafsås/Petter Northug 1:48:50.7   Maxim Vylegzhanin/Nikolay Pankratov/Alexander Legkov/Ilia Chernousov  1:48:55.8  Jens Filbrich/Axel Teichmann/René Sommerfeldt/Tobias Angerer  1:49:02.5

Figure skating
ISU Grand Prix:
Skate Canada International in Kitchener, Ontario, Canada: (skaters in bold qualify for the Grand Prix Final)
Ice Dance:  Tessa Virtue/Scott Moir  204.38  Nathalie Péchalat/Fabian Bourzat  185.07  Kaitlyn Weaver/Andrew Poje  165.64
Final standings: Meryl Davis/Charlie White , Virtue/Moir, Tanith Belbin/Benjamin Agosto  30 points, Pechalat/Bourzat, Anna Cappellini/Luca Lanotte  26, Sinead Kerr/John Kerr  24.

Football (soccer)
Beach Soccer World Cup in Dubai, United Arab Emirates:
Bronze medal match:   14–7 
Final:   10–5  
Brazil win the title for the fourth successive time and 13th time overall.
2011 FIFA Women's World Cup qualification (UEFA):
Group 8:  0–0 
Standings: Sweden 9 points (3 matches), Azerbaijan 4 (3), Belgium 4 (4), Wales 3 (4), Czech Republic 3 (2).
2011 Asian Cup qualification: (teams in bold qualify for 2011 AFC Asian Cup)
Group D:  1–0 
Standings (after 4 matches): Syria 10 points, China 9, Vietnam 4, Lebanon 0.
Group E:  1–0 
Standings (after 4 matches): Iran 7 points, Singapore 6, Thailand 5, Jordan 4.
 MLS Cup in Seattle:
Los Angeles Galaxy 1, Real Salt Lake 1. Real Salt Lake win 5–4 in penalty shootout.
Real Salt Lake win the title for the first time.
 FAI Cup Final in Dublin:
Sligo Rovers 1–2 Sporting Fingal
Sporting Fingal win their first trophy in only their second season, and qualify for the Europa League.
 Scottish Challenge Cup Final in Perth:
Dundee 3–2 Inverness Caledonian Thistle
Dundee win the Cup for the second time.

Golf
European Tour:
Dubai World Championship in United Arab Emirates:
Winner: Lee Westwood  265 (−23)
Westwood's win also places him atop the season-ending money list, giving him a US$1.5 million Race to Dubai bonus.
LPGA Tour:
LPGA Tour Championship in Richmond, Texas:
Bad weather caused the suspension of play on Friday and Saturday, and the event was shortened to 54 holes. The second round resumes today, but is suspended due to darkness with about a quarter of the field still on the course. On Monday, the second round is due to be completed, a cut made, and the final round played.

Skeleton
World Cup in Lake Placid, United States:
Team:  Frank Rommel, Sandra Kiriasis/Berit Wiacker, Marion Trott, Thomas Florschütz/Marc Kühne  3:46.92  Eric Bernotas, Erin Pac/Jamie Greubel, Noelle Pikus-Pace, John Napier/T.J. Burns  3:47.97  Jon Montgomery, Kaillie Humphries/Amanda Morely, Mellisa Hollingsworth, Lyndon Rush/Neville Wright  3:48.18

Speed skating
World Cup 3 in Hamar, Norway:
1500 m women:  Kristina Groves  1:55.16  Ireen Wüst  1:55.95  Martina Sáblíková  1:56.34
Standings (after 3 of 6 races): (1) Groves 230 points (2) Wüst 204 (3) Christine Nesbitt  180
10000 m men:  Sven Kramer  12:50.96  Bob de Jong  12:54.97  Ivan Skobrev  13:01.41
Standings (after 3 of 6 races): (1) Kramer 300 (2) de Jong 230 (3) Håvard Bøkko  210

Swimming
2009 FINA Swimming World Cup – Series 5 in Singapore:
World records set:
Men's 50m backstroke: Peter Marshall  22.61
Women's 50m butterfly: Therese Alshammar  24.38
Women's 400m individual medley: Katheryn Meaklim  4:22.88
World Cup records set:
Women's 100m freestyle: Francesca Halsall  51.19

Tennis
ATP World Tour:
ATP World Tour Finals in London, United Kingdom:
Group A:
(4) Andy Murray  def. (5) Juan Martín del Potro  6–3, 3–6, 6–2
(1) Roger Federer  def. (7) Fernando Verdasco  4–6, 7–5, 6–1

Volleyball
Men's World Grand Champions Cup in Japan:
Round 4 in Nagoya:
 0–3 
 1–3 
 0–3 
Standings: Brazil 8 points, Cuba, Japan 7, Iran, Poland 5, Egypt 4.

Weightlifting
World Championships in Goyang, South Korea:
Women 53kg:
Snatch:  Chen Xiaoting  95 kg  Yoon Jin-Hee  93 kg  Svetlana Cheremshanova  92 kg
Clean & Jerk:  Zulfiya Chinshanlo  129 kg  Chen 123 kg  Yoon 116 kg
Total:  Chinshanlo 219 kg  Chen 218 kg  Yoon 209 kg
Men 69kg:
Snatch:  Liao Hui  160 kg  Ninel Miculescu  155 kg  Arakel Mirzoyan  154 kg
Clean & Jerk:  Liao 186 kg  Kim Sun-Bae  181 kg  Triyatno  180 kg
Total:  Liao 346 kg  Mirzoyan 334 kg  Triyatno 330 kg

November 21, 2009 (Saturday)

American football
NCAA:
BCS Top 10 (unbeaten teams in bold):
(1) Florida 62, Florida International 3
(2) Alabama 45, Chattanooga 0
(3) Texas 51, Kansas 20
 Longhorns quarterback Colt McCoy sets a new Division I FBS record for career wins by a starting quarterback with 43.
(4) TCU 45, Wyoming 10
Mississippi 25, (8) LSU 23
Michigan–Ohio State rivalry: (10) Ohio State 21, Michigan 10
Played earlier this week: (6) Boise State
Idle: (5) Cincinnati, (7) Georgia Tech, (9) Pittsburgh
Other games:
Northwestern 33, (16) Wisconsin 31
The Big Game: (25) California 34, (17) Stanford 28

Auto racing
Nationwide Series:
Ford 300 in Homestead, Florida:
(1) Kyle Busch  (Toyota, Joe Gibbs Racing) (2) Carl Edwards  (Ford, Roush Fenway Racing) (3) Jeff Burton  (Chevrolet, Richard Childress Racing)
 Final driver standings: (1) Busch 5682 points (2) Edwards 5472 (3) Brad Keselowski  (Chevrolet, JR Motorsports) 5364
V8 Supercars:
BigPond 300 in Perth, Western Australia:
Race 23: (1) Jamie Whincup  (Ford Falcon) (2) Todd Kelly  (Holden Commodore) (3) Mark Winterbottom  (Ford Falcon)
Drivers' standings (after 23 of 26 races): (1) Whincup 3054 points (2) Will Davison  (Holden Commodore) 2893 (3) Garth Tander  (Holden Commodore) 2636

Bobsleigh
World Cup in Lake Placid, United States:
Two-man:  John Napier/Charles Berkeley  1:53.62  Steven Holcomb/Justin Olsen  1:53.88  Ivo Rüegg/Roman Handschin  1:53.91
Standings (after 2 of 8 races): (1) Holcomb 402 points (2) Rüegg 400 (3)  Alexandr Zubkov  360
Women:  Cathleen Martini/Romy Logsch  1:56.15  Sandra Kiriasis/Janine Tischer  1:56.56  Kaillie Humphries/Heather Moyse  1:57.23
Standings (after 2 of 8 races): (1) Martini 450 points (2) Kiriasis 420 (3) Humphries 376

Canadian football
CIS football championships:
Mitchell Bowl national semi-final game:
 (4) Queen's Golden Gaels 33, (1) Laval Rouge et Or 30
 The Gaels deny the Rouge et Or the chance to defend the Vanier Cup in front of a home crowd.  Laval quarterback Benoit Groulx was uncharacteristically sacked 7 times in the game.
Uteck Bowl national semi-final game:
(2) Calgary Dinos 38, (6) Saint Mary's Huskies 14
Dinos coach Blake Nill and quarterback Erik Glavic make their return to Halifax, where Nill was the Huskies head coach and Glavic was their quarterback.  The Dinos improve to 3–1 all time against the Huskies.

Cross-country skiing
World Cup in Beitostolen, Norway:
Women's 10 km Freestyle:  Marit Bjørgen  24:48.3  Charlotte Kalla 25:18.0   Anna Haag  25:25.5
Men's 15 km Freestyle:  Ronny Hafsås  34:42.1  Vincent Vittoz 34:42.3   Matti Heikkinen  34:48.7

Figure skating
ISU Grand Prix:
Skate Canada International in Kitchener, Ontario, Canada: (skaters in bold qualify for the Grand Prix Final)
Ice Dance – standings after Original Dance: (1) Tessa Virtue/Scott Moir  101.26 (2) Nathalie Péchalat/Fabian Bourzat  91.60 (3) Kaitlyn Weaver/Andrew Poje  83.36
Pairs:  Aliona Savchenko/Robin Szolkowy  206.71 (WR)  Maria Mukhortova/Maxim Trankov  185.71  Jessica Dubé/Bryce Davison  166.93
Savchenko and Szolkowy improve the former record of Shen/Zhao by 0.17 points.
Final standings: Shen Xue/Zhao Hongbo , Pang Qing/Tong Jian  30 points, Mukhortova/Trankov 28, Savchenko/Szolkowy, Yuko Kavaguti/Alexander Smirnov  26, Zhang Dan/Zhang Hao , Dubé/Davison, Tatiana Volosozhar/Stanislav Morozov  24.
Men:  Jeremy Abbot  232.99  Daisuke Takahashi  231.31  Alban Preaubert  212.28
Final standings: Nobunari Oda  30 points, Evan Lysacek , Brian Joubert  24, Abbot, Takahashi, Johnny Weir  22.
Ladies:  Joannie Rochette  182.90  Alissa Czisny  163.53  Laura Lepistö  158.52
Final standings: Kim Yuna , Miki Ando  30 points, Rochette 26, Alena Leonova , Ashley Wagner  24, Akiko Suzuki , Rachael Flatt , Czisny 22.

Football (soccer)
Beach Soccer World Cup in Dubai, United Arab Emirates:
Semifinals:
 2–8 
 7–4 
2011 FIFA Women's World Cup qualification (UEFA):
Group 1:  0–2 
Standings: France 12 points (4 matches), Iceland 9 (4), Northern Ireland 3 (2), Croatia, Serbia 1 (3).
Group 2:  1–1 
Standings: Norway 6 points (2 matches), Belarus 4 (2), Netherlands 4 (3), Slovakia 3 (2).
Group 3:  5–0 
Standings: Denmark 7 points (3 matches), Scotland 6 (2), Bulgaria 4 (3), Greece 3 (3).
Group 5:  0–5 
Standings: Spain 12 points (4 matches), England 3 (1), Austria 3 (3).
Group 7:
 0–4 
 7–0 
Standings: Finland 12 points (4 matches), Italy 9 (3), Portugal 3 (3), Slovenia 3 (4).
 Russian Premier League, matchday 29 of 30: (teams in bold qualify for the Champions League)
(1) Rubin Kazan 0–0 (3) Zenit St. Petersburg
(2) Spartak Moscow 2–3 (6) CSKA Moscow
(4) FC Moscow 0–2 (13) Spartak Nalchik
(8) Dynamo Moscow 0–2 (5) Lokomotiv Moscow
Standings: Rubin Kazan 60 points, Spartak Moscow 55, Zenit, Lokomotiv Moscow 51, CSKA Moscow 49, FC Moscow 48.
Rubin Kazan win the championship for the second straight season.

Luge
World Cup in Calgary, Canada:
Women:  Tatjana Hüfner  1:33.691  Natalie Geisenberger  1:33.858  Anke Wischnewski  1:34.024
Men:  Armin Zöggeler  1:30.068  David Möller  1:30.124  Albert Demtschenko  1:30.166

Rugby union
End of year tests:
Week 4:
 27–6  in Tokyo
 10–32  in Udine
 6–19  in London
 Dan Carter becomes the all-time leading Test point scorer for the All Blacks, surpassing Andrew Mehrtens.
 33–16  in Cardiff
 43–5  in Saint-Denis
 41–6  in Dublin
 9–8  in Edinburgh
 Scotland survive a last-second try by the Wallabies' Ryan Cross, as Matt Giteau misses the would-be winning conversion, and pick up their first win over the Wallabies since 1982.
 13–24  in Lisbon
2011 Rugby World Cup qualifying:
Americas Round 4, second leg (first leg score in parentheses):
 27–6 (27–22)  in Lauderhill, Florida. USA win 54–28 on aggregate.
United States qualify for Pool C of the Rugby World Cup, while Uruguay advance to the Final Place Playoff to face the second place Asian team in the semifinal.

Snowboarding
World Cup in Stockholm, Sweden:
Men's Big Air:  Stefan Gimpl   Marko Grilc   Gjermund Braaten 
Standings after 3 of 12 events: (1) Gimpl 3000.0 points (2) GianLuca Cavigelli  2100.0 (3) Braaten 1460.0

Speed skating
World Cup 3 in Hamar, Norway:
1500 m men:  Shani Davis  1:44.27  Lucas Makowsky  1:45.40  Håvard Bøkko  1:45.61
Standings after 3 of 6 races: (1) Davis 300 points (2) Bøkko 230 (3) Mark Tuitert  155
5000 m women:  Martina Sáblíková  6:50.07  Stephanie Beckert  6:52.79  Daniela Anschütz-Thoms  6:59.62
Standings after 3 of 6 races: (1) Sáblíková 280 points (2) Beckert 250 (3)  Anschütz-Thoms 200

Volleyball
Men's World Grand Champions Cup in Japan:
Round 3 in Nagoya:
 3–0 
 3–2 
 3–2 
Standings: Brazil, Japan 6 points, Cuba 5, Iran 4, Egypt, Poland 3.

Weightlifting
World Championships in Goyang, South Korea:
Men 62kg:
Snatch:  Ding Jianjun  146 kg  Yang Fan  144 kg  Eko Yuli Irawan  140 kg
Clean & Jerk:  Irawan 175 kg  Yang Sheng-Hsiung  170 kg  Yang Fan 170 kg
Total:  Ding 316 kg  Irawan 315 kg  Yang Fan 314 kg
Women 48kg:
Snatch:  Wang Mingjuan  93 kg  Nurcan Taylan  90 kg  Sibel Özkan  89 kg
Clean & Jerk:  Özkan 117 kg  Taylan 115 kg  Wang 115 kg
Total:  Wang 208 kg  Özkan 206 kg  Taylan 205 kg

November 20, 2009 (Friday)

American football
NCAA BCS Top 10 (unbeaten team in bold)
(6) Boise State 52, Utah State 21

Cricket
Sri Lanka in India:
1st Test in Ahmedabad, day 5:
 426 & 412/4 (129.0 ov, Gautam Gambhir 114, Sachin Tendulkar 100*);  760/7d. Match drawn, 3-match series level 0–0.
England in South Africa:
1st ODI in Johannesburg:
Match abandoned without a ball bowled, 5-match series level 0–0.

Figure skating
ISU Grand Prix:
Skate Canada International in Kitchener, Ontario, Canada:
Pairs' Short Program: (1) Aliona Savchenko/Robin Szolkowy  74.16 (2) Maria Mukhortova/Maxim Trankov  65.80 (3) Jessica Dubé/Bryce Davison  57.90
Ladies' Short Program: (1) Joannie Rochette  70.00 (2) Alissa Czisny  63.52 (3) Mirai Nagasu  56.34
Ice Dance – Compulsory Dance: (1) Tessa Virtue/Scott Moir  40.69 (2) Nathalie Péchalat/Fabian Bourzat  35.55 (3) Kaitlyn Weaver/Andrew Poje  32.18
Men's Short Program: (1) Jeremy Abbot  79.00 (2) Daisuke Takahashi  76.30 (3) Denis Ten  75.45

Football (soccer)
Beach Soccer World Cup in Dubai, United Arab Emirates:
Quarterfinals:
 1–2 
 2–4 
 6–4 
 3–2 (ET)

Luge
World Cup in Calgary, Canada:
Doubles:  Patric Leitner/Alexander Resch  1:27.855  André Florschütz/Torsten Wustlich  1:27.886  Christian Oberstolz/Patrick Gruber  1:28.059

Rugby union
End of year tests:
Week 4:
Italy A  8–7  in Palmanova
Scotland A  38–7  in Galashiels

Skeleton
World Cup in Lake Placid, United States:
Men:  Frank Rommel  1:50.88  Sandro Stielicke  1:51.36  Martins Dukurs  1:51.37
Standings after 2 of 8 races: (1) Dukurs 425 points (2) Stielicke 420 (3) Rommel 417
Women:  Mellisa Hollingsworth  1:54.85  Shelley Rudman  1:55.08  Marion Trott  1:55.13
Standings after 2 of 8 races: (1) Hollingswoth 425 points (2) Rudman 402 (3) Amy Gough  386

Weightlifting
World Championships in Goyang, South Korea:
Men 56kg:
Snatch:  Wu Jingbiao  131 kg  Long Qingquan  130 kg  Khalil El Maoui  125 kg
Clean & Jerk:  Long 162 kg  Wu 155 kg  Sergio Álvarez  154 kg
Total:  Long 292 kg  Wu 286 kg  Álvarez 274 kg

November 19, 2009 (Thursday)

American football
NFL Week 11:
Miami Dolphins 24, Carolina Panthers 17
 Ricky Williams leads the Dolphins with three rushing touchdowns while filling in for Ronnie Brown, out for the rest of the season with a foot injury.

Baseball
 Major League Baseball awards:
National League Cy Young Award — Tim Lincecum, San Francisco Giants
 Lincecum becomes the eighth pitcher to win the award in consecutive seasons.

Cricket
Sri Lanka in India:
1st Test in Ahmedabad, day 4:
 426 & 190/2 (45.0 ov);  760/7d (Mahela Jayawardene 275, Prasanna Jayawardene 154*). India trail by 144 runs with 8 wickets remaining.

Football (soccer)
Copa Sudamericana Semifinals, second leg: (first leg score in parentheses)
LDU Quito  7–0 (1–2)  River Plate. LDU Quito win 8–2 on aggregate.

Snooker
Premier League Snooker – League phase in Llandudno, Wales: (players in bold advance to the semifinals)
Marco Fu  5–1 Stephen Hendry 
Ronnie O'Sullivan  2–4 John Higgins 
Shaun Murphy  2–4 Judd Trump 
Final standings: Higgins 10 points, Trump 8, O'Sullivan 6, Murphy, Hendry, Neil Robertson 5, Fu 3.

Volleyball
Men's World Grand Champions Cup in Japan:
Round 2 in Osaka:
 1–3 
 1–3 
 1–3 
Standings: Japan, Brazil 4 points, Cuba, Iran 3, Egypt, Poland 2.

November 18, 2009 (Wednesday)

Baseball
 Major League Baseball awards:
Manager of the Year:
American League — Mike Scioscia, Los Angeles Angels
National League — Jim Tracy, Colorado Rockies

Cricket
Sri Lanka in India:
1st Test in Ahmedabad, day 3:
 426;  591/5 (160.0 ov, Mahela Jayawardene 204*). Sri Lanka lead by 165 runs with 5 wickets remaining in the 1st innings.
Jayawardene becomes the seventh batsman in history to score six Test double-centuries, and Sri Lanka by far exceed their previous highest score in India of 420.

Football (soccer)
2010 FIFA World Cup qualification: (teams in bold qualify for 2010 FIFA World Cup)
UEFA Playoffs, second leg: (first leg score in parentheses)
 0–1 (0–0) . Greece win 1–0 on aggregate.
 1–0 (1–2) . 2–2 on aggregate, Slovenia win on away goals.
Greece and Slovenia both qualify for the World Cup for the second time.
 0–1 (0–1) . Portugal win 2–0 on aggregate.
 1–1 (ET) (1–0) . France win 2–1 on aggregate.
The reigning World Cup runners-up qualify for the Finals thanks to a controversial goal by William Gallas in the 13th minute of extra time after Thierry Henry handled the ball.
COMNEBOL / CONCACAF Intercontinental Playoffs, second leg: (first leg score in parentheses)
 1–1 (1–0) . Uruguay win 2–1 on aggregate.
CAF Third Round:
Group C tiebreaker play-offs in Omdurman, Sudan:
 1–0 
A goal by Antar Yahia in the 40th minute puts the Desert Foxes in the World Cup Finals for the third time after a break of 24 years.
Beach Soccer World Cup in Dubai, United Arab Emirates: (teams in bold advance to the quarterfinals)
Group A:
 6–1 
 0–4 
Final standings: Uruguay, Portugal 6 points, UAE, Solomon Islands 3.
Group B:
 9–6 
 7–2 
Final standings: Japan 8 points, Spain 6, Côte d'Ivoire 3, El Salvador 0.
Group C:
 1–3 
 3–3 (3–4 pen.) 
Final standings: Russia 6 points, Italy, Argentina 5, Costa Rica 0.
Group D:
 9–3 
 4–2 
Final standings: Brazil 9 points, Switzerland 6, Nigeria 3, Bahrain 0.
2011 FIFA Women's World Cup qualification (UEFA):
Group 5:  0–2 
Standings: Spain 9 points (3 matches), England 3 (1), Austria 3 (3).
2011 Asian Cup qualification: (teams in bold qualify for 2011 AFC Asian Cup)
Group A:
 0–4 
 4–0 
Standings: Bahrain 9 points (3 matches), Japan 9 (4), Yemen 3 (3), Hong Kong 0 (4).
Group B:  1–1 
Standings after 4 matches: Kuwait, Australia 7 points, Oman 4, Indonesia 3.
Group C:  1–3 
Standings: Uzbekistan 9 points (3 matches), UAE 3 (2), Malaysia 0 (3).
Group D:  0–0 
Standings: Syria 10 points (4 matches), China 6 (3), Vietnam 4 (4), Lebanon 0 (3).
Group E:  0–1 
Standings: Iran 7 points (3 matches), Singapore 6 (4), Thailand 5 (4), Jordan 1 (3).
Copa Sudamericana Semifinals, second leg: (first leg score in parentheses)
Fluminense  2–1 (1–0)  Cerro Porteño. Fluminense win 3–1 on aggregate.
 Colombian Cup Final, second leg: (first leg score in parentheses)
Santa Fe 2–1 (1–2) Deportivo Pasto.  3–3 on aggregate, Santa Fe win 5–4 in penalty shootout.

Volleyball
Men's World Grand Champions Cup in Japan:
Round 1 in Osaka:
 2–3 
 2–3 
 3–2

November 17, 2009 (Tuesday)

American football
 NFL news:
 The Buffalo Bills, currently 3–6, become the first team this season to fire its head coach, axing Dick Jauron. The team's defensive coordinator, Perry Fewell, is named interim head coach, becoming the team's first black head coach.

Baseball
 Major League Baseball awards:
American League Cy Young Award — Zach Greinke, Kansas City Royals

Cricket
Sri Lanka in India:
1st Test in Ahmedabad, day 2:
 426 (104.5 ov, Rahul Dravid 177);  275/3 (70.0 ov, Tillakaratne Dilshan 112). Sri Lanka trail by 151 runs with 7 wickets remaining in the 1st innings.
Dilshan scores the first century by a Sri Lankan player in India since 1997.

Football (soccer)
Beach Soccer World Cup in Dubai, United Arab Emirates: (teams in bold advance to the quarterfinals)
Group A:
 1–2 
 1–7 
Standings: UAE, Portugal, Uruguay, Solomon Islands 3 points.
Group B:
 3–2 
 3–7 
Standings: Japan 5 points, Spain, Côte d'Ivoire 3, El Salvador 0.
Group C:
 0–6 
 1–3 
Standings: Russia 6 points, Argentina 3, Italy 2, Costa Rica 0.
Group D:
 2–7 
 1–8 
Standings: Brazil, Switzerland 6 points, Bahrain, Nigeria 0.
2011 FIFA Women's World Cup qualification (UEFA):
Group 6:  1–6 
Standings: Russia 9 points (3 matches), Switzerland 6 (3), Ireland 6 (4), Israel 3 (3).

Rugby union
End of year tests:
Week 4:
Saracens  24–23  in London
 Saracens come back from an 18–6 halftime deficit and send the Rugby World Cup holders to their third straight defeat of their current tour.

November 16, 2009 (Monday)

American football
NFL Monday Night Football Week 10:
Baltimore Ravens 16, Cleveland Browns 0

Baseball
 Major League Baseball awards:
Rookies of the Year:
American League — Andrew Bailey, closer, Oakland Athletics
National League — Chris Coghlan, outfielder, Florida Marlins

Cricket
Sri Lanka in India:
1st Test in Ahmedabad, day 1:
 385/6 (90.0 ov, Rahul Dravid 177*, Mahendra Singh Dhoni 110)
Dravid becomes the fifth player ever to reach 11,000 runs in Test matches.

Football (soccer)
Beach Soccer World Cup in Dubai, United Arab Emirates:
Group A:
 6–7 
 5–7 
Group B:
 7–6 
 5–5 (2–3 pen.) 
Group C:
 2–3 (ET) 
 5–1 
Group D:
 6–5 
 11–5

November 15, 2009 (Sunday)

Alpine skiing
Men's World Cup in Levi, Finland:
Slalom:  Reinfried Herbst  1:49.79  Ivica Kostelić  1:50.07  Jean-Baptiste Grange  1:50.32
Overall standings after 2 of 34 races: (1) Kostelić 102 points (2) Herbst & Didier Cuche  100

American football
NFL Week 10 (unbeaten teams in bold):
Jacksonville Jaguars 24, New York Jets 22
Carolina Panthers 28, Atlanta Falcons 19
Washington Redskins 27, Denver Broncos 17
Cincinnati Bengals 18, Pittsburgh Steelers 12
Tennessee Titans 41, Buffalo Bills 17
New Orleans Saints 28, St. Louis Rams 23
Miami Dolphins 25, Tampa Bay Buccaneers 23
Minnesota Vikings 27, Detroit Lions 10
San Diego Chargers 31, Philadelphia Eagles 23
The Eagles' Donovan McNabb throws for 450 yards, and becomes the third quarterback this season with a 400-yard game.
Kansas City Chiefs 16, Oakland Raiders 10
Green Bay Packers 17, Dallas Cowboys 7
Arizona Cardinals 31, Seattle Seahawks 20
Sunday Night Football: Indianapolis Colts 35, New England Patriots 34
The Colts stay unbeaten after coming back from a 31–17 fourth-quarter deficit. After Patriots coach Bill Belichick makes a controversial decision not to punt when faced with 4th-and-2 inside the Pats' 30-yard-line with little more than 2 minutes left, the Colts take over on downs and cap off their comeback with a 1-yard Peyton Manning touchdown pass to Reggie Wayne with 16 seconds left.
Bye week: Houston Texans, New York Giants

Auto racing
Chase for the Sprint Cup:
Checker O'Reilly Auto Parts 500 in Avondale, Arizona:
(1) Jimmie Johnson  (Chevrolet, Hendrick Motorsports) (2) Jeff Burton  (Chevrolet, Richard Childress Racing) (3) Denny Hamlin  (Toyota, Joe Gibbs Racing)
Standings (with 1 race remaining): (1) Johnson 6492 points (2) Mark Martin  (Chevrolet, Hendrick Motorsports) 6384 (3) Jeff Gordon  (Chevrolet, Hendrick Motorsports) 6323
Johnson will win a fourth consecutive Cup title by finishing 25th or better in next week's race at Homestead.

Badminton
BWF Super Series:
Hong Kong Super Series in Hong Kong:
Women's Singles: Wang Yihan  [3] def. Jiang Yanjiao  [6] 21–13 21–15
Mixed Doubles: Robert Mateusiak/Nadieżda Kostiuczyk  def. Nova Widianto/Liliyana Natsir  [3] 22–20 21–16
Men's Singles: Lee Chong Wei  [1] def. Peter Gade  [3] 21–13 13–21 21–16
Women's Doubles: Ma Jin/Wang Xiaoli  [4] def. Du Jing/Yu Yang  [3] 16–21 21–19 21–12
Men's Doubles: Jung Jae-sung/Lee Yong-dae  [3] def. Lars Paaske/Jonas Rasmussen  [7] 13–21 21–15 21–8

Canadian football
Grey Cup Playoffs:
Division semifinals:
BC Lions 34, Hamilton Tiger-Cats 27 (OT)
Calgary Stampeders 24, Edmonton Eskimos 21

Cricket
England in South Africa:
2nd T20I in Centurion:
 241/6 (20/20 ov);  157/8 (20/20 ov). South Africa win by 84 runs. 2-match series drawn 1–1.
South Africa score the second-highest total in Twenty20 Internationals history, including a record first-wicket partnership of 170 for Graeme Smith & Loots Bosman and a record 17 sixes.

Figure skating
ISU Grand Prix:
Skate America in Lake Placid, New York, United States: (skaters in bold qualify for the Grand Prix Final)
Ladies:  Kim Yuna  187.98  Rachael Flatt  174.91  Júlia Sebestyén  159.03
Standings after 5 of 6 events: Kim, Miki Ando  30 points, Alena Leonova , Ashley Wagner  24, Flatt 22.
Ice Dance:  Tanith Belbin/Benjamin Agosto  195.85  Anna Cappellini/Luca Lanotte  171.86  Alexandra Zaretski/Roman Zaretski  171.77
Standings after 5 events: Meryl Davis/Charlie White , Belbin/Agosto 30 points, Cappellini/Lanotte 26, Sinead Kerr/John Kerr  24, Jana Khokhlova/Sergei Novitski  22.

Football (soccer)
2010 FIFA World Cup qualification: (teams in bold qualify for 2010 FIFA World Cup, teams in italics qualify for 2010 African Cup of Nations)
CAF Third Round, matchday 6:
Group D:
 2–2 
Final standings: Ghana 13 points, Benin 10, Mali 9, Sudan 1.
U-17 World Cup in Nigeria:
Third place match:  0–1  
Final:   1–0  
A goal by Haris Seferovic in the 63rd minute gives the Swiss their first ever football global trophy, and denies the Golden Eaglets a record fourth title.
 Chile Cup Final in Valparaíso:
Unión San Felipe 3–0 Municipal Iquique
Unión San Felipe win the Cup for the first time, and qualify for 2010 Copa Sudamericana.

Golf
PGA Tour:
Fall Series:
Children's Miracle Network Classic in Lake Buena Vista, Florida:
Winner: Stephen Ames / 270 (−18) PO
Ames wins the final event of the PGA Tour season in a three-way playoff over George McNeill , eliminated on the second playoff hole, and Justin Leonard , eliminated on the first.
European Tour:
UBS Hong Kong Open in Hong Kong, China:
Winner: Grégory Bourdy  261 (−19)
JBWere Masters in Melbourne, Australia:
Winner: Tiger Woods  274 (−14)
Woods wins his first title in Australia.
LPGA Tour:
Lorena Ochoa Invitational in Guadalajara, Mexico:
Winner: Michelle Wie  275 (−13)
Wie collects her first LPGA Tour win.

Rugby union
End of year tests:
Week 3:
 46–8  in Sendai
 20–20  in Dublin
Ireland equalise in the final minute with a try by captain Brian O'Driscoll, who became the 11th player in history to make his 100th Test appearance, and Ronan O'Gara's conversion, to deny the Wallabies a successful Grand Slam tour.

Short track speed skating
World Cup in Marquette, Michigan, United States:
Men:
1000 m:  Apolo Anton Ohno   Lee Jung-Su   François Hamelin 
Final standings:  Lee 2600 points  Ohno 1722  Charles Hamelin  1650
5000 m Relay:      
Final standings:   3000 points   2600   2080
Women:
1000 m:  Wang Meng   Katherine Reutter   Park Seung-Hi 
Final standings:  Wang 2600 points  Reutter 2312  Zhou Yang  1738
3000 m Relay:      
Final standings:   3000 points   2210   2112

Speed skating
World Cup 2 in Heerenveen, Netherlands:
1000 m women:  Christine Nesbitt  1:15.47  Annette Gerritsen  1:16.03  Natasja Bruintjes  1:16.08
Standings after 2 of 7 races: (1) Nesbitt 200 (2) Gerritsen 125 (3) Margot Boer  120
1000 m men:  Shani Davis  1:08.48  Simon Kuipers  1:09.06  Mo Tae-bum  1:09.11
Standings after 2 of 7 races: (1) Davis 200 points (2) Mark Tuitert  120 (3) Mun Jun  115
Team pursuit women:   3:00.39   3:02.12   3:02.40
Team pursuit men:   &  3:43.94   3:45.62

Tennis
ATP World Tour:
BNP Paribas Masters in Paris, France:
Final: Novak Djokovic  def. Gaël Monfils  6–2, 5–7, 7–6(3)
Djokovic wins his 5th title of the year and 16th of his career. It's his first win in five Masters Series finals this year, and fifth Masters Series title of his career.

Volleyball
Women's World Grand Champions Cup in Japan:
Round 5 in Fukuoka:
 3–0 
 0–3 
 1–3 
Final standings:  Italy 10 points,  Brazil 9,  Dominican Republic 8, Japan 7, Korea 6, Thailand 5.
Italy win the title for the first time.

November 14, 2009 (Saturday)

Alpine skiing
Women's World Cup in Levi, Finland:
Slalom:  Maria Riesch  1:48.71  Lindsey Vonn  1:48.79  Tanja Poutiainen  1:49.87
Overall standings after 2 of 33 events: (1) Poutiainen 160 points (2) Riesch 113 (3) Vonn 109

American football
NCAA:
BCS Top 10 (unbeaten teams in bold):
(1) Florida 24, South Carolina 14
(2) Alabama 31, Mississippi State 3
(3) Texas 47, Baylor 14
Texas quarterback Colt McCoy wins his 42nd game as a starter, tying the FBS record of former Georgia QB David Greene.
(4) TCU 55, (16) Utah 28
(6) Boise State 63, Idaho 25
(7) Georgia Tech 49, Duke 10
The Yellow Jackets book a trip to Tampa for the ACC Championship Game.
(8) LSU 24, Louisiana Tech 16
Stanford 55, (9) USC 21
 The Cardinal hand the Trojans their worst home loss since 1966, and put up the highest score of any USC opponent in history.
(11) Ohio State 27, (10) Iowa 24 (OT)
Devin Barclay's 39-yard field goal in the first overtime gives the Buckeyes the Big Ten's automatic BCS berth, most likely putting them in the Rose Bowl.
Played earlier this week: (5) Cincinnati
Other games:
North Carolina 33, (14) Miami 24
UCF 37, (15) Houston 32
California 24, (17) Arizona 16

Auto racing
Nationwide Series:
Able Body Labor 200 in Avondale, Arizona:
(1) Carl Edwards  (Ford, Roush Fenway Racing) (2) Kevin Harvick  (Chevrolet, Kevin Harvick Incorporated) (3) Reed Sorenson  (Toyota, Braun Racing)
 Standings (with 1 race remaining): (1) Kyle Busch  (Toyota, Joe Gibbs Racing) 5487 points (2) Edwards 5297 (3) Brad Keselowski  (Chevrolet, JR Motorsports) 5242
 Busch needs only to start next week's race at Homestead to claim the season title.

Baseball
KBO-NPB Club Championship in Nagasaki, Japan:
Yomiuri Giants  9, Kia Tigers  4

Bobsleigh
World Cup in Park City, United States:
Four-man:  Lyndon Rush/Chris le Bihan/Dan Humphries/Lascelles Brown  1:36.43  Jānis Miņins/Daumants Dreiškens/Oskars Melbārdis/Intars Dambis  & Dmitry Abramovitch/Filipp Yegorov/Dmitriy Stepushkin/Sergey Prudnikov  1:36.45

Boxing
Miguel Angel Cotto vs. Manny Pacquiao in Las Vegas: TV bouts:
 Manny Pacquiao def.  Miguel Angel Cotto via TKO in the 12th round after the referee stopped the fight to win the WBO welterweight championship.
Cotto was knocked down thrice before the referee stopped the fight.
 Julio César Chávez Jr. KOd  Troy Rowland in the 7th round.
 Yuri Foreman def.  Daniel Santos via unanimous decision.

Canadian football
CIS football championships (CIS Top Ten rankings in parentheses):
Hardy Cup Canada West championship game:
(2) Calgary Dinos 39, (3) Saskatchewan Huskies 38
Yates Cup OUA championship game:
(4) Queen's Golden Gaels 43, (5) Western Ontario Mustangs 39
Dunsmore Cup QUFL championship game:
(1) Laval Rouge-et-Or 31, (8) Montreal Carabins 7
Loney Bowl AUS championship game:
(6) Saint Mary's Huskies 31, (10) St. Francis Xavier X-Men 22

Figure skating
ISU Grand Prix:
Skate America in Lake Placid, New York, United States: (skaters in bold qualify for the Grand Prix Final)
Ice Dance – standings after Original Dance: (1) Tanith Belbin/Benjamin Agosto  100.23 (2) Jana Khokhlova/Sergei Novitski  86.47 (3) Anna Cappellini/Luca Lanotte  86.13
Pairs:  Shen Xue/Zhao Hongbo  201.40  Tatiana Volosozhar/Stanislav Morozov  171.82  Zhang Dan/Zhang Hao  168.19
Standings after 5 of 6 events: Shen/Zhao, Pang Qing/Tong Jian  30 points, Yuko Kavaguti/Alexander Smirnov  26, Zhang/Zhang, Volosozhar/Morozov 24.
Ladies' Short Program: (1) Kim Yuna  76.28 (WR) (2) Rachael Flatt  58.80 (3) Júlia Sebestyén  58.54
Kim improves her own world record from the 2009 World Championships by 0.12 points.
Men:  Evan Lysacek  237.72  Shawn Sawyer  203.91  Ryan Bradley  198.12
Standings after 5 events: Nobunari Oda  30 points, Lysacek 28, Brian Joubert  24, Johnny Weir  22, Tomáš Verner  20.

Football (soccer)
2010 FIFA World Cup qualification: (teams in bold qualify for 2010 FIFA World Cup)
UEFA Playoffs, first leg:
 0–1 
 1–0 
 0–0 
 2–1 
CONMEBOL / CONCACAF Intercontinental Playoffs, first leg:
 0–1 
CAF Third Round, matchday 6: (teams in italics qualify for 2010 African Cup of Nations)
Group A:
 1–0 
 0–2 
The Indomitable Lions qualify for the World Cup for the sixth time.
Final standings: Cameroon 13 points, Gabon 9, Togo 8, Morocco 3.
Group B:
 1–0 
 2–3 
83rd-minute goals by Obafemi Martins for Nigeria and Dário for Mozambique give the Super Eagles their passage to the World Cup Finals for the fourth time.
Final standings: Nigeria 12 points, Tunisia 11, Mozambique 7, Kenya 3.
Group C:
 0–0 
 2–0 
Goals by Amr Zaki after 2 minutes and Emad Moteab in the 5th minute of injury time put the Pharaohs level with the Desert Foxes at the top of the group and send the teams to a tiebreaker playoff match in Omdurman, Sudan, on November 18.
Final standings: Algeria, Egypt 13 points, Zambia 5, Rwanda 2.
Group D:
 1–2 
Standings: Ghana 12 points (5 matches), Benin 10 (6), Mali 8 (5), Sudan 1 (6).
Group E:
 1–0 
 3–0 
Final standings: Côte d'Ivoire 16 points, Burkina Faso 12, Malawi 4, Guinea 3.
OFC / AFC Intercontinental Playoffs, second leg: (first leg score in parentheses)
 1–0 (0–0) . New Zealand win 1–0 on aggregate.
Rory Fallon scores in the 45th minute, and goalkeeper Mark Paston saves a penalty from Sayed Mohamed Adnan, to lift the All Whites to the World Cup Finals for the second time, while Bahrain is eliminated in the intercontinental playoffs for the second straight time.
2011 FIFA Women's World Cup qualification (UEFA):
Group 4:  1–1 
2011 Asian Cup qualification:
Group B:
 2–1 
 1–2 
Group C:
 3–1 
Group D:
 0–1 
 0–2 
Group E:
 1–3 
 1–0 
Friendly international matches: (teams in bold have qualified for 2010 FIFA World Cup)
 3–0 
 1–0  in Doha, Qatar
 5–0 
 0–0 
 0–0 
 0–0 
 1–1 
 3–0 
 0–1 
 0–1 
 1–1 
 1–0 
 0–0 
 2–1 
 0–1 
 3–0 
 MLS Cup Playoffs:
Eastern Conference Finals:
Real Salt Lake 0, Chicago Fire 0. Real Salt Lake win 5–4 in penalty shootout.

Gymnastics
Trampoline World Championships in Saint Petersburg, Russia:
Double Mini Men:  André Lico  75.500  Tim Lunding  69.600  André Fernandes  69.300
Tumbling Men:  Tagir Murtazaev  77.300  Yang Song  75.000  Mikhail Kostyanov  73.900
Double Mini Women:  Victoria Voronina  68.300  Galina Goncharenko  68.000  Corissa Boychuk  67.100
Trampoline Synchro Men:  Tetsuya Sotomura/Yasuhiro Ueyama  50.800  Sébastien Martiny/Grégoire Pennes  50.000  Oleksandr Chernonos/Yuriy Nikitin  50.000
Tumbling Women:  Anna Korobeynikova  69.400  Elena Krasnokutskaya  66.900  Ashley Speed  62.800
Individual Trampoline Women:  Huang Shanshan  39.500  He Wenna  39.400  Karen Cockburn  38.700

Rugby league
Four Nations Final in Leeds, England:
 46–16 
Australia win the tournament for the fourth time.
Atlantic Cup in Jacksonville, Florida, United States:
 37–22

Rugby union
End of year tests:
Week 3:
 6–20  in Milan
 16–9  in London
 23–10  in Edinburgh
 24–22  in Tbilisi
2011 Rugby World Cup qualifying:
Africa Round 3, first leg:
 13–18  in Tunis
Americas Round 4, first leg:
 22–27  in Montevideo

Short track speed skating
World Cup in Marquette, Michigan, United States:
Men:
1500 m:  Lee Jung-Su  2:13.595  Apolo Anton Ohno  2:13.731  Charles Hamelin  2:14.216
Final standings:  Lee 2440 points  Hamelin 2152  Sung Si-Bak  1869
500 m:  François-Louis Tremblay  40.684  Thibaut Fauconnet  40.909  Sung Si-Bak  40.651
Final standings:  Charles Hamelin  2328 points   Tremblay 2024  Sung 1608
Women:
1500 m:  Zhou Yang  2:22.700  Liu Qiuhong  2:22.870  Lee Eun-Byul  2:22.919
Final standings:  Zhou 2640 points  Lee 2440  Katherine Reutter  1968
500 m:  Wang Meng  42.961  Kalyna Roberge  43.267  Marianne St-Gelais CAN 43.373
Final standings:  Wang 3000 points  Roberge 2240  Zhao Nannan  1952

Speed skating
World Cup 2 in Heerenveen, Netherlands:
500 m women:  Jenny Wolf  37.83  Wang Beixing  38.07  Annette Gerritsen  38.18
Standings after 4 of 12 races: (1) Wolf 380 points (2) Wang 340 (3) Gerritsen 270
500 m men:  Joji Kato  34.98  Jan Smeekens  35.02  Lee Kang-seok  35.13
Standings after 4 of 12 races: (1) Lee 310 points (2) Keiichiro Nagashima  251 (3) Tucker Fredricks  246
1500 m women:  Ireen Wüst  1:56.69  Christine Nesbitt  1:56.74  Kristina Groves  1:57.05
Standings after 2 of 6 races: (1) Nesbitt 180 points (2) Groves 130 (3) Wüst 124
5000 m men:  Sven Kramer  6:16.29  Bob de Jong  6:16.38  Håvard Bøkko  6:17.10
Standings after 2 of 6 races: (1) Kramer 200 points (2) de Jong 150 (3) Bøkko 150

Volleyball
Women's World Grand Champions Cup in Japan:
Round 4 in Fukuoka:
 2–3 
 3–0 
 3–1 
Standings: Italy 8 points, Brazil 7, Japan, Dominican Republic 6, Korea 5, Thailand 4.

November 13, 2009 (Friday)

American football
NCAA:
BCS Top 10 (unbeaten team in bold):
 (5) Cincinnati 24, (25) West Virginia 21
 The Bearcats go to 10–0 for the first time in history.

Auto racing
 Camping World Truck Series:
 Ron Hornaday Jr. clinches his record fourth Truck Series title by finishing fourth at the Lucas Oil 150, the first of three NASCAR races this weekend at Phoenix. The 51-year-old Hornaday also becomes the oldest driver ever to win a season title in a NASCAR national touring series.

Basketball
 College basketball news:
 Harry Statham, head coach at the NAIA school McKendree, becomes the first men's coach at a four-year school to reach 1,000 career wins. (AP via ESPN)

Bobsleigh
World Cup in Park City, United States:
Women:  Cathleen Martini/Romy Logsch  1:39.92  Sandra Kiriasis/Berit Wiacker  1:40.12  Erin Pac/Michelle Rzepka  1:40.32
Two-man:  Beat Hefti/Alex Baumann (SUI) 1:37.08  Todd Hays/Steven Langton (USA) 1:37.19  Ivo Rüegg/Cedric Grand (SUI) 1:37.25

Cricket
England in South Africa:
1st T20I in Johannesburg:
 202/6 (20/20 ov);  127/3 (13/13 ov). England win by 1 run (D/L method), lead the 2-match series 1–0.
Pakistan v New Zealand in UAE:
2nd T20I in Dubai:
 153/5 (20/20 ov);  146/5 (20/20 ov). Pakistan win by 7 runs, win the 2-match series 2–0.

Figure skating
ISU Grand Prix:
Skate America in Lake Placid, New York, United States:
Ice Dance – Compulsory Dance: (1) Tanith Belbin/Benjamin Agosto   39.28 (2) Jana Khokhlova/Sergei Novitski  36.94 (3) Anna Cappellini/Luca Lanotte  32.04
Pairs' Short Program: (1) Shen Xue/Zhao Hongbo  74.36 (2) Tatiana Volosozhar/Stanislav Morozov  61.70 (3) Meagan Duhamel/Craig Buntin  59.64
Men's Short Program: (1) Evan Lysacek  79.17 (2) Florent Amodio  72.65 (3) Brandon Mroz  71.40

Football (soccer)
 MLS Cup Playoffs:
Western Conference Finals:
Los Angeles Galaxy 2, Houston Dynamo 0 (OT)
The Galaxy advance to the MLS Cup for a record sixth time.

Gymnastics
Trampoline World Championships in Saint Petersburg, Russia:
Double Mini Women Team:   105.100   102.600   101.900
Tumbling Women Team:   100.900   94.000   93.400
Double Mini Men Team:   110.800   110.500   98.700
Trampoline Synchro Women:  Li Dan/Zhong Xingping  47.600  Karen Cockburn/Rosannagh MacLennan  46.900  Anna Savkina/Ekaterina Khilko  45.300
Tumbling Men Team:   110.900   109.400   104.500
Individual Trampoline Men:  Dong Dong  42.900  Lu Chunlong  42.300  Yasuhiro Ueyama  42.100

Rugby union
End of year tests:
Week 3:
 17–13  in Cardiff
 20–13  in Toulouse
Ireland A 48–19  in Belfast
 33–6  in Piacenza

Speed skating
World Cup 2 in Heerenveen, Netherlands:
500 m women:  Jenny Wolf  37.92  Wang Beixing  38.19  Annette Gerritsen  38.23
500 m men:  Keiichiro Nagashima  34.98  Tucker Fredricks  35.00  Ronald Mulder  35.07
3000 m women:  Stephanie Beckert  4:05.29  Martina Sáblíková  4:05.68  Daniela Anschütz-Thoms  4:05.73
Standings after 2 of 6 races: (1) Sáblíková 180 (2) Beckert 170 (3) Anschütz-Thoms 130
1500 m men:  Shani Davis  1:44.48  Håvard Bøkko  1:45.57  Stefan Groothuis  1:45.74
Standings after 2 of 6 races: (1) Davis 200 (2) Bøkko 160 (3) Groothuis 130

November 12, 2009 (Thursday)

American football
NFL Week 10:
San Francisco 49ers 10, Chicago Bears 6
NCAA:
BCS Top 25:
Rutgers 31, (24) South Florida 0

Basketball
Euroleague:
Regular Season Game 4:
Group B:
Lietuvos Rytas  78–56  Partizan
Olympiacos  105–90  Efes Pilsen
Standings: Unicaja 4–0, Olympiacos, Lietuvos Rytas 3–1, Efes Pilsen, Partizan 1–3, Orléans 0–4.
Group C:
Lottomatica Roma  90–92 (OT)  Maccabi Tel Aviv
Standings: Roma, Maccabi, Caja Laboral 3–1, CSKA Moscow 2–2, Maroussi 1–3, Olimpija 0–4.
Group D:
Armani Jeans Milano  68–72  Khimki Moscow Region
Standings: Panathinaikos, Real Madrid, Khimki 3–1, Milano, Asseco Prokom, EWE Baskets 1–3.
NBA news:
The New Orleans Hornets become the first team this season to fire its head coach, dismissing Byron Scott after a 3–6 start. (ESPN)

Cricket
Pakistan v New Zealand in UAE:
1st T20I in Dubai:
 161/8 (20/20 ov);  112 (18.3/20 ov). Pakistan win by 49 runs, lead the 2-match series 1–0.

Football (soccer)
U-17 World Cup in Nigeria:
Semifinals:
 0–4 
 1–3 
UEFA Women's Champions League Round of 16, second leg: (first leg score in parentheses)
Lyon  5–0 (1–0)  Fortuna Hjørring. Lyon win 6–0 on aggregate.
Copa Sudamericana Semifinals, first leg:
River Plate  2–1  LDU Quito

Gymnastics
Trampoline World Championships in Saint Petersburg, Russia:
Trampoline Women Team:  China 117.00  Russia 110.30  Canada 109.60
Trampoline Men Team:  China 126.70  Belarus 120.50  Russia 117.00

Rugby union
Independent arbitrators appointed by SANZAR, the body that operates the Tri Nations and Super 14 competitions, award the 15th Super Rugby franchise to Melbourne. The new team will begin play in an expanded Super 15 competition in 2011. (Australian Associated Press)

Skeleton
World Cup in Park City, United States:
Men:  Martins Dukurs  1:39.75  Sandro Stielicke  1:40.27  Kristan Bromley  1:40.37
Women:  Anja Huber  51.22  Amy Gough  51.36  Mellisa Hollingsworth  51.37
The second heat was cancelled because of snow and strong winds.

Snooker
Premier League Snooker – League phase in Weston-super-Mare, Somerset: (players in bold advance to the semifinals)
John Higgins  4–2 Judd Trump 
Shaun Murphy  4–2 Neil Robertson 
Standings: Higgins 8 points (5 games), Trump, Ronnie O'Sullivan 6 (5), Stephen Hendry, Murphy 5 (5), Robertson 5 (6), Marco Fu 1 (5).

Volleyball
Women's World Grand Champions Cup in Japan:
Round 3 in Tokyo:
 0–3 
 0–3 
 3–0 
Standings: Brazil, Italy 6 points, Japan 5, Dominican Republic 4, Thailand, Korea 3.

November 11, 2009 (Wednesday)

Basketball
Euroleague:
Regular Season Game 4 (unbeaten teams in bold):
Group A:
Cibona Zagreb  64–52  Žalgiris Kaunas
Fenerbahçe Ülker Istanbul  83–87  Montepaschi Siena
Regal FC Barcelona  76–62  ASVEL Villeurbanne
Standings: Siena and Barcelona 4–0, Fenerbahçe Ülker 2–2, Cibona and Žalgiris 1–3, Villeurbanne 0–4.
Group B:
Orléans  74–86  Unicaja Málaga
Group C:
Maroussi Athens  86–103  Caja Laboral Baskonia
CSKA Moscow  79–69  Union Olimpija Ljubljana
Group D:
Asseco Prokom Gdynia  65–75  Panathinaikos Athens
EWE Baskets Oldenburg  61–104  Real Madrid

Cricket
Australia in India:
7th ODI in Navi Mumbai:
Match abandoned without a ball bowled. Australia win the 7-match series 4–2.

Football (soccer)
UEFA Women's Champions League Round of 16, second leg: (first leg score in parentheses)
Torres  4–1 (4–1)  Neulengbach. Torres win 8–2 on aggregate.
Arsenal  2–0 (3–0)  Sparta Praha. Arsenal win 5–0 on aggregate.
Zvezda 2005 Perm  1–1 (0–0)  Røa. 1–1 on aggregate, Røa win on away goals.
Umeå  1–1 (1–0)  Rossiyanka. Umeå win 2–1 on aggregate.
Bayern Munich  0–1 (ET) (0–0)  Montpellier. Montpellier win 1–0 on aggregate.
Linköping  0–2 (1–1)  Duisburg. Duisburg win 3–1 on aggregate.
Brøndby  0–4 (0–1)  Turbine Potsdam. Turbine Potsdam win 5–0 on aggregate.
Copa Sudamericana Semifinals, first leg:
Cerro Porteño  0–1  Fluminense

Volleyball
Women's World Grand Champions Cup in Japan:
Round 2 in Tokyo:
 1–3 
 3–2 
 3–1 
Standings: Brazil, Italy 4 points, Japan, Dominican Republic 3, Thailand, Korea 2.

November 10, 2009 (Tuesday)

Cricket
Zimbabwe in South Africa:
2nd ODI in Centurion:
 331/5 (50 ov, Jean-Paul Duminy 111*);  119 (34.3 ov). South Africa win by 212 runs, win the 2-match series 2–0.

Football (Soccer)
 Copa del Rey Round of 32, second leg: (first leg score in parentheses)
Real Madrid 1–0 (0–4) Alcorcón
In a stunning result, Real Madrid is eliminated by third division team Alcorcón, 4–1 on aggregate.

Volleyball
Women's World Grand Champions Cup in Japan:
Round 1 in Tokyo:
 0–3 
 0–3 
 3–1

November 9, 2009 (Monday)

American football
NFL Monday Night Football Week 9:
Pittsburgh Steelers 28, Denver Broncos 10

Basketball
NCAA:
Jim Boeheim becomes the eighth Division I coach to record 800 wins, reaching the mark in his 1,087th game, as Syracuse defeats Albany 75–43.

Cricket
Pakistan v New Zealand in UAE:
3rd ODI in Abu Dhabi:
 211 (46.3 ov);  204 (49.1 ov). New Zealand win by 7 runs, win the 3-match series 2–1.

Football (soccer)
U-17 World Cup in Nigeria:
Quarterfinals:
 3–3 (4–2 pen.) 
Korea Republic  1–3

Poker
World Series of Poker in Las Vegas, Nevada, United States:
Joe Cada defeats Darvin Moon to win the US$8,547,042 first prize, and becomes the youngest winner of the US$10,000 Buy-in Main Event at the age of 21.

November 8, 2009 (Sunday)

American football
NFL Week 9 (unbeaten teams in bold):
Atlanta Falcons 31, Washington Redskins 17
Arizona Cardinals 41, Chicago Bears 21
Cincinnati Bengals 17, Baltimore Ravens 7
Indianapolis Colts 20, Houston Texans 17
The Colts become the fourth team in NFL history to win 17 straight regular-season games and Jim Caldwell becomes the first rookie coach since 1930 to win his first eight games.
Jacksonville Jaguars 24, Kansas City Chiefs 21
New England Patriots 27, Miami Dolphins 17
Tampa Bay Buccaneers 38, Green Bay Packers 28
Josh Freeman passes for 205 yards and three touchdowns in his first game as starting quarterback and leads the Bucs to their first win after an 11-game losing streak.
New Orleans Saints 30, Carolina Panthers 20
 The Saints rally from a 14–0 first-quarter deficit to stay unbeaten.
Seattle Seahawks 32, Detroit Lions 20
Tennessee Titans 34, San Francisco 49ers 27
San Diego Chargers 21, New York Giants 20
Sunday Night Football: Dallas Cowboys 20, Philadelphia Eagles 16
Bye week: Buffalo Bills, Cleveland Browns, Minnesota Vikings, New York Jets, Oakland Raiders, St. Louis Rams
College football news:
In the BCS rankings, TCU rises to fourth—the highest ever for a school in a conference whose champion does not automatically qualify for one of the five BCS bowls.

Auto racing
Chase for the Sprint Cup:
Dickies 500 in Fort Worth, Texas:
(1) Kurt Busch  (Dodge, Penske Racing) (2) Denny Hamlin  (Toyota, Joe Gibbs Racing) (3) Matt Kenseth  (Ford, Roush Fenway Racing)
Drivers' standings (with 2 races remaining): (1) Jimmie Johnson  (Chevrolet, Hendrick Motorsports) 6297 points (2) Mark Martin  (Chevrolet, Hendrick Motorsports) 6224 (−79) (3) Jeff Gordon  (Chevrolet, Hendrick Motorsports) 6185 (−112)
An accident on Lap Three involving Johnson cuts his points lead, finishing 35th in the race.

Cricket
Australia in India:
6th ODI in Guwahati:
 170 (48 ov);  172/4 (41.5 ov). Australia win by 6 wickets, clinch the series and lead the 7-match series 4–2.
Zimbabwe in South Africa:
1st ODI in Benoni:
 295/5 (50 ov);  250/6 (50 ov, Tatenda Taibu 103*). South Africa win by 45 runs, lead the 2-match series 1–0.

Figure skating
ISU Grand Prix:
NHK Trophy in Nagano, Japan: (skaters in bold qualify for the Grand Prix Final)
Ice Dance:  Meryl Davis/Charlie White  201.97  Sinead Kerr/John Kerr  177.73  Vanessa Crone/Paul Poirier  165.89
Standings after 4 of 6 events: Davis/White 30 points, Kerr/Kerr 24, Crone/Poirier 20.

Football (soccer)
U-17 World Cup in Nigeria:
Quarterfinals:
 1–1 (5–3 pen.) 
 2–1 
 MLS Cup Playoffs:
Western Conference Semifinals, second leg: (first leg score in parentheses)
Houston Dynamo 1 (0), Seattle Sounders FC 0 (0) (OT). Houston Dynamo win 1–0 on aggregate.
Los Angeles Galaxy 1 (2), Chivas USA 0 (2). Los Angeles Galaxy win 3–2 on aggregate.
 Norwegian Cup Final in Oslo:
Molde 2–2 (4–5 pen.) Aalesund
Aalesund win the first trophy in their history, and qualify for next year's Europa League.
 Korean FA Cup Final in Seongnam:
Seongnam Ilhwa Chunma 1–1 (2–4 pen.) Suwon Samsung Bluewings
Suwon Bluewings win the Cup for the second time.
 Singapore Cup Final in Jalan Besar:
Geylang United  1–0  Bangkok Glass

Golf
World Golf Championships:
HSBC Champions in Shanghai:
 Winner: Phil Mickelson  271 (−17)
LPGA Tour:
Mizuno Classic in Shima, Mie, Japan:
 Winner: Bo Bae Song  201 (−15)

Motorcycle racing
Moto GP:
Valencian Grand Prix in Valencia: (1) Dani Pedrosa  (Honda) 46:47.553 (2) Valentino Rossi  (Yamaha) +2.630 (3) Jorge Lorenzo  (Yamaha) +2.913
Final riders' standings: (1) Rossi 306 points (2) Lorenzo 261 (3) Pedrosa 234
Final manufacturers' standings: (1) Yamaha 386 (2) Honda 297 (3) Ducati 272

Rugby league
European Cup:
Final in Bridgend, Wales:
  16–28  
Wales win the trophy for the fifth time.
3rd place playoff in Maesteg, Wales:
  40–16 
5th place playoff in Maesteg:
 42–14 
Serbia will be relegated to the European Shield in 2010.

Short track speed skating
World Cup in Montreal, Canada:
Men:
1000 m:  Sung Si-Bak   Lee Jung-Su   Charles Hamelin 
5000 m Relay:  South Korea  Canada  China
Women:
1000 m:  Zhou Yang   Wang Meng   Liu Qiohong 
3000 m Relay:  China  United States  Canada

Speed skating
World Cup 1 in Berlin, Germany:
500 m women (2):  Jenny Wolf  37.52  Wang Beixing  37.94  Annette Gerritsen  38.27
Standing after 2 of 12 races: Wolf, Wang 180 points, Gerritsen 130
500 m men (2):  Tucker Fredricks  35.06  Lee Kang-seok  35.10  Lee Kyou-hyuk  35.10
Standing after 2 of 12 races: Lee Kang-seok 180 points, Lee Kyou-hyuk 150, Fredricks 116
1500 m women:  Christine Nesbitt  1:55.54  Martina Sáblíková  1:56.99  Brittany Schussler  1:57.26
1500 m men:  Shani Davis  1:44.47  Håvard Bøkko  1:45.56  Denny Morrison  1:45.69

Tennis
ATP World Tour:
Valencia Open 500 in Valencia, Spain:
Final: Andy Murray  def. Mikhail Youzhny  6–3, 6–2
Murray wins his sixth title of the year and 14th of his career in his first tournament back from a wrist injury.
Davidoff Swiss Indoors in Basel, Switzerland:
Final: Novak Djokovic  def. Roger Federer  6–4, 4–6, 6–2
Djokovic wins his fourth title of the year and 15th of his career, and denies Federer a fourth consecutive win at his hometown tournament.
WTA Tour:
Commonwealth Bank Tournament of Champions in Bali, Indonesia:
Final: Aravane Rezaï  def. Marion Bartoli  7–5 (ret.)
Rezaï wins her second tournament of the year and her career when top seed Bartoli is forced to retire with a quadriceps injury.
Fed Cup:
Fed Cup Final in Reggio Calabria, day 2:
 4–0 
Flavia Pennetta  def. Melanie Oudin  7–5, 6–2
Francesca Schiavone  vs. Alexa Glatch  not played
Sara Errani/Roberta Vinci  def. Liezel Huber/Vania King  4–6, 6–3, 11–9
Italy beat the US for the first time in 10 meetings, and win the Fed Cup for the second time.

Volleyball
Men's Club World Championship in Doha, Qatar:
3rd place:  Zenit Kazan  3–0  Paykan Tehran
Final:  PGE Skra Bełchatów  0–3   Trentino BetClic
Trentino BetClic becomes the fifth consecutive Italian title winner.

November 7, 2009 (Saturday)

American football
NCAA:
BCS Top 10 (unbeaten teams in bold):
(1) Florida 27, Vanderbilt 3
(2) Texas 35, UCF 3
(3) Alabama 24, (9) LSU 15
 The Tide book their place in the SEC Championship Game against Florida.
Northwestern 17, (4) Iowa 10
 Iowa quarterback Ricky Stanzi is knocked out of the game with an apparent ankle injury on a play that gives the Wildcats their first touchdown, and the Hawkeyes' unbeaten season and national title hopes go down with him.
(5) Cincinnati 47, Connecticut 45
(6) TCU 55, San Diego State 12
Stanford 51, (8) Oregon 42
(10) Georgia Tech 30, Wake Forest 27 (OT)
Played earlier this week: (7) Boise State
Other games:
(16) Ohio State 24, (11) Penn State 7
 Oregon State 31, (20) California 14
 Navy 23, (22) Notre Dame 21
 The Midshipmen win consecutive games in South Bend for the first time since 1961 and 1963.
 Nebraska 10, (24) Oklahoma 3

Auto racing
Nationwide Series:
O'Reilly Challenge in Fort Worth, Texas:
(1) Kyle Busch  (Toyota, Joe Gibbs Racing) (2) Casey Mears  (Chevrolet, Richard Childress Racing) (3) Jason Leffler  (Toyota, Braun Racing)
Standings (with 2 races remaining): (1) Busch 5374 points (2) Carl Edwards  (Ford, Roush Fenway Racing) 5102 (3) Brad Keselowski  (Chevrolet, JR Motorsports) 5082
V8 Supercars:
The Island 300 in Phillip Island, Victoria:
Race 21: (1) Jamie Whincup  (Ford Falcon) (2) Will Davison  (Holden Commodore) (3) Rick Kelly  (Holden Commodore)
Drivers' standings (after 21 of 26 races): (1) Whincup 2754 points (2) Davison 2710 (3) Garth Tander  (Holden Commodore) 2435

Baseball
Nippon Professional Baseball postseason:
Japan Series:
Game 6, Yomiuri Giants 2, Hokkaido Nippon-Ham Fighters 0. Giants win best-of-7 series 4–2.
The Giants win the Series for a record 21st time.

Canadian football
CIS football championships (CIS Top Ten rankings in parentheses):
Hardy Cup Canada West semifinals:
(2) Calgary Dinos 45, Alberta Golden Bears 13
(3) Saskatchewan Huskies 53, Regina Rams 23
Yates Cup OUA semifinals:
(4) Queen's Golden Gaels 32, (9) McMaster Marauders 6
(5) Western Ontario Mustangs 26, (7) Wilfrid Laurier Golden Hawks 16
Dunsmore Cup QUFL semifinals:
(1) Laval Rouge-et-Or 63, Concordia Stingers 1
(8) Montreal Carabins 40, Bishop's Gaiters 15
Loney Bowl AUS semifinal:
(10) St. Francis Xavier X-Men 33, Acadia Axemen 30

Figure skating
ISU Grand Prix:
NHK Trophy in Nagano, Japan: (skaters in bold qualify for the Grand Prix Final)
Ice Dance – standings after Original Dance: (1) Meryl Davis/Charlie White  101.18 (2) Sinead Kerr/John Kerr  91.57 (3) Vanessa Crone/Paul Poirier  81.38
Pairs:  Pang Qing/Tong Jian  199.65  Yuko Kavaguti/Alexander Smirnov  193.05  Rena Inoue/John Baldwin  158.78
Standings after 4 of 6 events: Pang/Tong 30 points, Kavaguti/Smirnov 26, Inoue/Baldwin 20.
Men:  Brian Joubert  232.70  Johnny Weir  217.70  Michal Březina  217.48
Standings: Nobunari Oda  30 points, Joubert 24, Weir 22.
Ladies:  Miki Ando  162.55  Alena Leonova  160.85  Ashley Wagner  155.99
Standings: Ando 30 points, Leonova, Wagner 24.

Football (soccer)
CAF Champions League finals, second leg: (first leg score in parentheses)
TP Mazembe  1–0 (1–2)  Heartland. Aggregate 2–2, TP Mazembe win on away goals.
TP Mazembe win the title for the third time, and qualify for FIFA Club World Cup.
AFC Champions League Final in Tokyo:
Al-Ittihad  1–2  Pohang Steelers
Pohang Steelers win the title for the third time, and qualify for FIFA Club World Cup.
 MLS Cup Playoffs:
Eastern Conference Semifinals, second leg: (first leg score in parentheses)
Chicago Fire 2 (1), New England Revolution 0 (2). Chicago Fire win 3–2 on aggregate.
The Fire will play against Real Salt Lake at home in the Conference Final on November 14.
 Swedish Cup Final in Solna:
AIK 2–0 IFK Göteborg
AIK win the Cup for the eighth time and complete a league-cup double.

Horse racing
Breeders' Cup in Arcadia, California, Day 2:
Juvenile Turf:
 Winner: Pounced (jockey Frankie Dettori, trainer John Gosden)
Turf Sprint:
 Winner: California Flag (jockey Joe Talamo, trainer Brian Koriner)
Sprint:
 Winner: Dancing in Silks (jockey Joel Rosario, trainer Carla Gaines)
 The 25–1 shot wins in a four-horse photo finish.
Juvenile:
 Winner: Vale of York (jockey Ahmed Ajtabi, trainer Saeed bin Suroor)
Mile:
 Winner: Goldikova (jockey Olivier Peslier, trainer Freddy Head)
 Goldikova becomes the fourth horse to win the Mile twice. Head, already the first person to both ride and train winners of a Breeders' Cup race, becomes the first person to score consecutive wins in both roles.
Dirt Mile:
 Winner: Furthest Land (jockey Julien Leparoux, trainer Michael J. Maker)
Turf:
 Winner: Conduit (jockey Ryan Moore, trainer Michael Stoute)
 Conduit becomes the second horse to successfully defend a Breeders' Cup title this year.
Classic:
 Winner: Zenyatta (jockey Mike Smith, trainer John Shirreffs)
 The unbeaten Zenyatta becomes the first filly or mare to win the Classic, and the first horse ever to win two different Breeders' Cup races.

Rugby league
Four Nations: (teams in bold advance to the Final)
Round 3:
 20–12 
 4–42 
Final standings: Australia 5 points, England 4, New Zealand 3, France 0.

Rugby union
End of year tests:
Week 2:
 9–18  in London
 9–12  in Lisbon
 12–19  in Cardiff
Air New Zealand Cup Final in Christchurch:
Canterbury 28–20 Wellington
Canterbury win what is intended to be the final Air New Zealand Cup before the reorganisation of New Zealand domestic rugby in 2010.

Short track speed skating
World Cup in Montreal, Canada:
Men:
1500 m:  Charles Hamelin   Sung Si-Bak   Travis Jayner 
500 m:  Charles Hamelin   Apolo Anton Ohno   Jeff Simon 
Women:
1500 m:  Katherine Reutter   Cho Ha-Ri   Liu Qiohong 
500 m:  Wang Meng   Kalyna Roberge   Zhao Nannan

Speed skating
World Cup 1 in Berlin, Germany:
500 m women (1):  Wang Beixing  37.85  Jenny Wolf  38.04  Nao Kodaira  38.19|-
5000 m men:  Sven Kramer  6:14.69  Håvard Bøkko  6:17.17  Bob de Jong  6:19.22
1000 m women (1):  Christine Nesbitt  1:15.41  Nao Kodaira  1:15.92  Marianne Timmer  1:16.13

Tennis
Fed Cup:
Fed Cup Final in Reggio Calabria, day 1:
 2–0 
Flavia Pennetta  def. Alexa Glatch  6–3, 6–1
Francesca Schiavone  def. Melanie Oudin  7–6(2), 6–2

Volleyball
Men's Club World Championship in Doha, Qatar:
Semifinals:
PGE Skra Bełchatów  3–1  Zenit Kazan
Trentino BetClic  3–0  Paykan Tehran

November 6, 2009 (Friday)

American football
NCAA BCS Top 10 (unbeaten team in bold):
(7) Boise State 45, Louisiana Tech 35

Cricket
Pakistan v New Zealand in UAE:
2nd ODI in Abu Dhabi:
 303/8 (50 ov, Brendon McCullum 131);  239 (47.2 ov). New Zealand win by 64 runs. 3-match series level 1–1.

Figure skating
ISU Grand Prix:
NHK Trophy in Nagano, Japan:
Ice Dance – Compulsory Dance: (1) Meryl Davis/Charlie White  38.09 (2) Sinead Kerr/John Kerr  35.04 (3) Ekaterina Bobrova/Dmitri Soloviev  31.72
Pairs – Short Program: (1) Yuko Kavaguti/Alexander Smirnov  68.90 (2) Pang Qing/Tong Jian  67.30 (3) Caydee Denney/Jeremy Barrett  55.20
Men – Short Program: (1) Brian Joubert  85.35 (2) Jeremy Abbott  83.00 (3) Johnny Weir  78.35
Ladies – Short Program: (1) Ashley Wagner  56.54 (2) Miki Ando  56.22 (3) Yukari Nakano  54.92

Horse racing
Breeders' Cup in Arcadia, California, Day 1:
Marathon:
Winner: Man of Iron (jockey Johnny Murtagh, trainer Aidan O'Brien)
Juvenile Fillies Turf:
Winner: Tapitsfly (jockey Robby Albarado, trainer Dale Romans)
Juvenile Fillies:
Winner: She Be Wild (jockey Julien Leparoux, trainer Wayne Catalano)
Filly & Mare Turf:
Winner: Midday (jockey Thomas Queally, trainer Henry Cecil)
Filly & Mare Sprint:
Winner: Informed Decision (jockey Julien Leparoux, trainer Jonathan Sheppard)
Ladies' Classic:
Winner: Life Is Sweet (jockey: Garrett K. Gomez, trainer: John Shirreffs)

Rugby union
End of year tests:
Week 2:
Leicester Tigers  22–17  in Leicester

Speed skating
World Cup 1 in Berlin, Germany:
500 m men (1):  Lee Kang-seok  34.80  Lee Kyou-hyuk  35.02  Keiichiro Nagashima  35.13
3000 m women:  Martina Sáblíková  4:00.75  Masako Hozumi  4:06.25  Stephanie Beckert  4:07.17
1000 m men (1):  Shani Davis  1:08.53  Yevgeny Lalenkov  1:09.11  Mun Jun  1:09.43

November 5, 2009 (Thursday)

Baseball
Nippon Professional Baseball postseason:
Japan Series:
Game 5: Yomiuri Giants 3, Hokkaido Nippon-Ham Fighters 2. Giants lead best-of-7 series 3–2.
Shinji Takahashi's homer in the top of the 9th inning gives the Fighters the lead, but the Giants tie the game with a solo homer by Yoshiyuki Kamei and then Shinnosuke Abe ends it with a walk-off home run.

Basketball
Euroleague:
Regular Season Game 3: (unbeaten teams in bold)
Group A:
Žalgiris  70–77  Regal FC Barcelona
Group B:
Partizan  78–71  Orléans
Unicaja Málaga  93–88  Efes Pilsen
Group C:
Maccabi Tel Aviv  71–54  CSKA Moscow
Union Olimpija Ljubljana  76–82  Caja Laboral Baskonia
Group D:
Real Madrid  80–70  Panathinaikos Athens

Cricket
Australia in India:
5th ODI in Hyderabad:
 350/4 (50 ov, Shaun Marsh 112);  347 (49.4 ov, Sachin Tendulkar 175). Australia win by 3 runs, lead the 7-match series 3–2.
Zimbabwe in Bangladesh:
5th ODI in Chittagong:
 221/9 (50 ov, Brendan Taylor 118 *);  222/9 (49 ov). Bangladesh win by 1 wicket, win the 5-match series 4–1.

Football (soccer)
U-17 World Cup in Nigeria:
Round of 16:
 4–1 
 1–2 (ET) 
 1–1 (3–5 pen.)  Korea Republic
 5–0 
UEFA Europa League group stage, Matchday 4: (teams in bold advance to the round of 32)
Group A:
Anderlecht  3–1  Timişoara
Dinamo Zagreb  0–2  Ajax
Standings: Ajax, Anderlecht 8 points, Timişoara 2, Dinamo Zagreb 0.
Group B:
Slavia Prague  2–2  Valencia
Genoa  3–2  Lille
Standings: Lille 7, Valencia, Genoa 6, Slavia Prague 2.
Group C:
Hamburg  0–0  Celtic
Rapid Wien  0–3  Hapoel Tel Aviv
Standings: Hapoel Tel Aviv 9 points, Hamburg 7, Rapid Wien 4, Celtic 2.
Group D:
Sporting CP  1–1  Ventspils
Heerenveen  2–3  Hertha BSC
Standings: Sporting CP 10 points, Hertha BSC, Heerenveen 4, Ventspils 3.
Group E:
Roma  2–1  Fulham
Basel  3–1  CSKA Sofia
Standings: Basel 9, Roma 7, Fulham 5, CSKA Sofia 1.
Group F:
Dinamo București  0–3  Galatasaray
Sturm Graz  0–1  Panathinaikos
Standings: Galatasaray 10 points, Panathinaikos 9, Dinamo București 3, Sturm Graz 1.
Group G:
Levski Sofia  0–1  Red Bull Salzburg
Villarreal  4–1  Lazio
Standings: Red Bull Salzburg 12 points, Villarreal, Lazio 6, Levski Sofia 0.
Group H:
Twente  2–1  Sheriff Tiraspol
Fenerbahçe  3–1  Steaua București
Standings: Fenerbahçe 9 points, Twente 7, Sheriff Tiraspol 4, Steaua București 2.
Group I:
AEK Athens  2–2  BATE Borisov
Everton  0–2  Benfica
Standings: Benfica 9 points, Everton 6, BATE, AEK Athens 4.
Group J:
Toulouse  0–2  Shakhtar Donetsk
Partizan  2–4  Club Brugge
Standings: Shakhtar Donetsk 12 points, Club Brugge 7, Toulouse 4, Partizan 0.
Group K:
Copenhagen  1–1  PSV Eindhoven
CFR Cluj  2–3  Sparta Prague
Standings: PSV Eindhoven 8 points, Sparta Prague 7, Copenhagen 4, CFR Cluj 3.
Group L:
Werder Bremen  2–0  Austria Wien
Nacional  1–1  Athletic Bilbao
Standings: Werder Bremen 10 points, Athletic Bilbao 7, Nacional, Austria Wien 2.
UEFA Women's Champions League Round of 16, first leg:
Fortuna Hjørring  0–1  Lyon
Copa Sudamericana Quarterfinals, second leg: (first leg score in parentheses)
Universidad de Chile  0–1 (2–2)  Fluminense. Fluminense win 3–2 on aggregate.
LDU Quito  2–1 (1–1)  Vélez Sarsfield. LDU Quito win 3–2 on aggregate.
 MLS Cup Playoffs:
Eastern Conference Semifinals, second leg: (first leg score in parentheses)
Real Salt Lake 3 (1), Columbus Crew 2 (0). Real Salt Lake win 4–2 on aggregate.

Snooker
Premier League Snooker – League phase in Exeter, Devon
Marco Fu  2–4 Neil Robertson 
Ronnie O'Sullivan  2–4 Judd Trump 
Standings: John Higgins, Trump 6 points (4 games), O'Sullivan 6 (5), Stephen Hendry, Robertson 5 (5), Shaun Murphy 3 (4), Fu 1 (5).

Volleyball
Men's Club World Championship in Doha, Qatar: (teams in bold advance to the semifinals)
Pool A:
Zenit Kazan  3–0  Zamalek
Plataneros de Corozal  0–3  Trentino BetClic
Final standings: Trentino BetClic 6 points, Zenit Kazan 5, Zamalek 4, Plataneros de Corozal 3.
Pool B:
Paykan Tehran  3–0  Al-Arabi
Cimed  1–3  PGE Skra Bełchatów
Final standings: PGE Skra Bełchatów 6 points, Paykan Tehran 5, Cimed 4, Al-Arabi 3.

November 4, 2009 (Wednesday)

Baseball
Major League Baseball postseason:
World Series:
Game 6, New York Yankees 7, Philadelphia Phillies 3. Yankees win series 4–2.
 The Yankees win their 27th World Series and their first since 2000. Hideki Matsui is named World Series MVP.
Nippon Professional Baseball postseason:
Japan Series:
Game 4, Hokkaido Nippon-Ham Fighters 8, Yomiuri Giants 4. Series tied 2–2.

Basketball
Euroleague:
Regular Season Game 3: (unbeaten teams in bold)
Group A:
ASVEL Villeurbanne  65–82  Montepaschi Siena
Fenerbahçe Ülker  67–62  Cibona
Group B:
Olympiacos  97–73  Lietuvos Rytas
Group C:
Maroussi Athens  71–83  Lottomatica Roma
Group D:
Asseco Prokom Gdynia  88–83  Armani Jeans Milano
Khimki Moscow Region  77–72  EWE Baskets Oldenburg

Football (soccer)
U-17 World Cup in Nigeria:
Round of 16:
 2–3 
 2–0 
 4–3 (ET) 
 2–1  United States
UEFA Champions League group stage, Matchday 4: (teams in bold advance to the round of 16)
Group E:
Fiorentina  5–2  Debrecen
Lyon  1–1  Liverpool
Standings: Lyon 10 points, Fiorentina 9, Liverpool 4, Debrecen 0.
Group F:
Rubin Kazan  0–0  Barcelona
Dynamo Kyiv  1–2  Internazionale
Standings: Inter 6 points, Rubin Kazan, Barcelona 5, Dynamo Kyiv 4.
Group G:
Unirea Urziceni  1–1  Rangers in progress
Sevilla  1–1  Stuttgart in progress
Standings: Sevilla 10 points, Unirea Urziceni 5, Stuttgart 3, Rangers 2.
Group H:
Arsenal  4–1  AZ
Standard Liège  2–0  Olympiacos
Standings: Arsenal 10 points, Olympiacos 6, Standard Liège 4, AZ 2.
UEFA Women's Champions League Round of 16, first leg:
Røa  0–0  Zvezda 2005 Perm
Rossiyanka  0–1  Umeå
Sparta Praha  0–3  Arsenal
Montpellier  0–0  Bayern Munich
Turbine Potsdam  1–0  Brøndby
Neulengbach  1–4  Torres
Duisburg  1–1  Linköping
Copa Sudamericana Quarterfinals, second leg: (first leg score in parentheses)
San Lorenzo  0–1 (1–0)  River Plate.  1–1 on aggregate, River Plate win 7–6 on penalties.
Botafogo  1–3 (1–2)  Cerro Porteño. Cerro Porteño  win 5–2 on aggregate.

Volleyball
Men's Club World Championship in Doha, Qatar: (teams in bold advance to the semifinals)
Pool A:
Zamalek  3–2  Plataneros de Corozal
Trentino BetClic  3–2  Zenit Kazan
Standings: Trentino BetClic 4 points, Zenit Kazan, Zamalek 3, Plataneros de Corozal 2.
Pool B:
Al-Arabi  1–3  Cimed
PGE Skra Bełchatów  3–0  Paykan Tehran
Standings: PGE Skra Bełchatów 4 points, Cimed, Paykan Tehran 3, Al-Arabi 2.

November 3, 2009 (Tuesday)

Baseball
Nippon Professional Baseball postseason:
Japan Series:
Game 3, Yomiuri Giants 7, Hokkaido Nippon-Ham Fighters 4. Giants lead best-of-7 series 2–1.

Canadian football
CIS football:
The Canada West Universities Athletic Association overturns the results of three Manitoba Bisons victories due to ineligible players. As a result of this decision, the Bisons will drop out of the playoffs, and be replaced by the Regina Rams.

Cricket
Zimbabwe in Bangladesh:
4th ODI in Chittagong:
 44 (24.5 ov);  49/4 (11.5 ov). Bangladesh win by 6 wickets, lead the 5-match series 3–1.
Zimbabwe's 44 is the 5th lowest score in One-day internationals. Only 3 players in both teams managed to score in double-figures.
Pakistan v New Zealand in UAE:
1st ODI in Abu Dhabi:
 287/9 (50 ov);  149 (39.2 ov). Pakistan win by 138 runs, lead the 3-match series 1–0.

Football (soccer)
UEFA Champions League group stage, Matchday 4: (teams in bold advance to the round of 16)
Group A:
Bayern Munich  0–2  Bordeaux
Maccabi Haifa  0–1  Juventus
Standings: Bordeaux 10 points, Juventus 8, Bayern Munich 4, Maccabi Haifa 0.
Group B:
Manchester United  3–3  CSKA Moscow
Beşiktaş  0–3  Wolfsburg
Standings: Manchester United 10 points, Wolfsburg 7, CSKA Moscow 4, Beşiktaş 1.
Group C:
Milan  1–1  Real Madrid
Marseille  6–1  Zürich
Standings: Milan, Real Madrid 7 points, Marseille 6, Zürich 3.
Group D:
APOEL  0–1  Porto
Atlético Madrid  2–2  Chelsea
Standings: Chelsea 10 points, Porto 9, Atlético Madrid 2, APOEL 1.
AFC Cup Final in Kuwait City:
Al-Kuwait  2–1 (ET)  Al-Karamah

Horse racing
Melbourne Cup in Melbourne:
 Winner: Shocking (jockey: Corey Brown; trainer: Mark Kavanagh)

Rugby union
End of year tests:
Week 2:
Gloucester  5–36  in Gloucester

Volleyball
Men's Club World Championship in Doha, Qatar:
Pool A:
Trentino BetClic  3–1  Zamalek
Zenit Kazan  3–0  Plataneros de Corozal
Pool B:
PGE Skra Bełchatów  3–0  Al-Arabi
Paykan Tehran  3–1  Cimed

November 2, 2009 (Monday)

American football
NFL Monday Night Football Week 8 (unbeaten team in bold):
New Orleans Saints 35, Atlanta Falcons 27

Baseball
Major League Baseball postseason:
World Series:
Game 5: Philadelphia Phillies 8, New York Yankees 6. Yankees lead best-of-7 series 3–2.
 The Phillies' Chase Utley hits two home runs, and ties Reggie Jackson's  record of five homers in a Series.

Cricket
Australia in India:
4th ODI in Mohali:
 250 (49.2 ov);  226 (46.4 ov). Australia win by 24 runs. 7-match series level 2–2.

November 1, 2009 (Sunday)

American football
NFL Week 8 (unbeaten team in bold):
Houston Texans 31, Buffalo Bills 10
Chicago Bears 30, Cleveland Browns 6
Dallas Cowboys 38, Seattle Seahawks 17
St. Louis Rams 17, Detroit Lions 10
Steven Jackson runs 25 yards for a touchdown with 1:38 remaining to end the Rams' 17-game losing streak.
Baltimore Ravens 30, Denver Broncos 17
The Ravens hand the Broncos their first defeat of the season.
Indianapolis Colts 18, San Francisco 49ers 14
The Colts rally from 14–6 down late in the second quarter for their 16th straight regular-season win.
Miami Dolphins 30, New York Jets 25
The Dolphins' Ted Ginn Jr. becomes the first player in NFL history with two TD returns of 100 yards or more in the same game, and the first player since 1967 to score two TD returns in the same quarter.
Philadelphia Eagles 40, New York Giants 17
Tennessee Titans 30, Jacksonville Jaguars 13
The Titans end their winning drought as Chris Johnson and Maurice Jones-Drew each have two touchdown runs of more than 50 yards, making this the first game in NFL history with four such runs.
San Diego Chargers 24, Oakland Raiders 16
Carolina Panthers 34,  Arizona Cardinals 21
Minnesota Vikings 38, Green Bay Packers 26
Brett Favre passes for 244 yards and four touchdowns in his first regular-season appearance at Lambeau Field in an opposing uniform since he left the Packers after the 2007 season.
Bye week: Cincinnati Bengals, Kansas City Chiefs, New England Patriots, Pittsburgh Steelers, Tampa Bay Buccaneers, Washington Redskins

Athletics
New York City Marathon:
Men:  Meb Keflezighi  2:09:15  Robert Kipkoech Cheruiyot  2:09:56  Jaouad Gharib  2:10:25
Keflezighi becomes the USA's first men's winner since Alberto Salazar in 1982.
Women:  Derartu Tulu  2:28:52  Lyudmila Petrova  2:29:00  Christelle Daunay  2:29:16
Tulu becomes the first Ethiopian female winner.

Auto racing
Formula One:
Abu Dhabi Grand Prix in Yas Island:
(1) Sebastian Vettel  (Red Bull–Renault) 1:34:03.314 (2) Mark Webber  (Red Bull-Renault) +17.857 (3) Jenson Button  (Brawn–Mercedes) +18.467
Final Drivers' Championship standings: (1) Button 95 points (2) Vettel 84 (3) Rubens Barrichello  (Brawn-Mercedes) 77
Final Constructors' Championship standings: (1) Brawn-Mercedes 172 points (2) Red Bull-Renault 153.5 (3) McLaren-Mercedes 71
Chase for the Sprint Cup:
AMP Energy 500 in Eastaboga, Alabama:
 (1) Jamie McMurray  (Ford, Roush Fenway Racing) (2) Kasey Kahne  (Dodge, Richard Petty Motorsports) (3) Joey Logano  (Toyota, Joe Gibbs Racing)
 Drivers' standings (with 3 races remaining): (1) Jimmie Johnson  (Chevrolet, Hendrick Motorsports) 6248 points (2) Mark Martin  (Chevrolet, Hendrick Motorsports) 6064 (−184) (3) Jeff Gordon  (Chevrolet, Hendrick Motorsports) 6056 (−192)

Badminton
BWF Super Series:
French Super Series in Paris:
Mixed doubles final: Nova Widianto /Liliyana Natsir  [2] def. Hendra Aprida Gunawan /Vita Marissa  [7] 21–7 21–7
Women's singles final: Wang Yihan  [3] def. Wang Lin  [1] 21–9 21–12
Women's doubles final: Ma Jin /Wang Xiaoli  [5] def. Cheng Shu (CHN)/Zhao Yunlei  [2] 21–13 21–8
Men's singles final: Lin Dan  [1] def. Taufik Hidayat  [4] 21–6 21–15
Men's doubles final: Markis Kido /Hendra Setiawan  [1] def. Koo Kien Keat /Tan Boon Heong  [2] 15–21 21–15 21–14

Baseball
Major League Baseball postseason:
World Series:
Game 4: New York Yankees 7, Philadelphia Phillies 4. Yankees lead best-of-7 series 3–1.
The Yankees' Alex Rodriguez, after becoming the second player in history to be hit by pitches three times in the same World Series, breaks a ninth-inning tie with an RBI double, and Mariano Rivera closes out the Phils in the bottom of the inning.
Nippon Professional Baseball postseason:
Japan Series:
Game 2, Hokkaido Nippon-Ham Fighters 4, Yomiuri Giants 2. Best-of-7 series tied 1–1.

Football (soccer)
U-17 World Cup in Nigeria: (teams in bold advance to the round of 16)
Group E:
 1–4 
United States  1–0 
Final standings: Spain 9 points, USA 6, UAE 3, Malawi 0.
UAE advance to the round of 16 by virtue of a better fair-play record than Brazil and Netherlands.
Group F:
Korea Republic  2–0 
 0–0 
Final standings: Italy 7 points, Korea 6, Uruguay 4, Algeria 0.
CAF Champions League finals, first leg:
Heartland  2–1  TP Mazembe
 Allsvenskan, final matchday: (league standings in parentheses, team in bold qualify for the Champions League, teams in italics qualify for the Europa League)
(2) IFK Göteborg 1–2 (1) AIK
(3) Elfsborg 1–0 (7) Helsingborg
(14) Djurgården 2–0 (4) Kalmar
Final standings: AIK 61 points, IFK Göteborg 57, Elfsborg 55, Kalmar 50.
AIK win the championship for the 11th time in their history, and the first time since 1998, after beating IFK Göteborg in a deciding match, in which IFK needed a win to clinch the title. The two teams will meet again on November 7 in the Swedish Cup Final.
 Norwegian Premier League, final matchday:
Final standings: Rosenborg 69 points, Molde 56, Stabæk 53.
Rosenborg win the championship for the 21st time, after a break of 3 years.
 MLS Cup Playoffs:
Conference Semifinals, first leg:
New England Revolution 2, Chicago Fire 1
Los Angeles Galaxy 2, Chivas USA 2

Golf
European Tour:
Volvo World Match Play Championship in Casares, Spain
Winner: Ross Fisher  def. Anthony Kim  4 & 3
LPGA Tour:
Hana Bank-KOLON Championship in Incheon, South Korea
Winner: Na Yeon Choi  206 (−10)
Champions Tour:
Charles Schwab Cup Championship in Sonoma, California
Winner of tournament: John Cook  266 (−22)
Winner of Charles Schwab Cup (season points championship): Loren Roberts

Rugby league
European Cup: (teams in bold advance to the final)
Group 1:
 22–10 
Final standings: Scotland 4 points, Lebanon 2, Italy 0.
Group 2:
 42–12 
Final standings: Wales 4 points, Ireland 2, Serbia 0.
Pacific Cup:
Final in Port Moresby:
  14–42  
Papua New Guinea qualify for the 2010 Four Nations.

Tennis
ATP World Tour:
St. Petersburg Open in Saint Petersburg, Russia:
Final: Sergiy Stakhovsky  def. Horacio Zeballos  2–6, 7–6(8), 7–6(7)
Stakhovsky wins his first title of the year and second of his career.
Grand Prix de Tennis de Lyon in Lyon, France:
Final: Ivan Ljubičić  def. Michaël Llodra  7–5, 6–3
Ljubičić wins his first title of the year and ninth of his career.
Bank Austria-TennisTrophy in Vienna, Austria:
Final: Jürgen Melzer  def. Marin Čilić  6–3, 6–4
Melzer wins his first title of the year and second of his career.
WTA Tour:
WTA Tour Championships in Doha, Qatar:
Final: Serena Williams  def. Venus Williams  6–2, 7–6(4)
Serena Williams wins the WTA Tour Championships for the second time. This is her third title of the year and 35th of her career.

References

XI